

528001–528100 

|-bgcolor=#d6d6d6
| 528001 ||  || — || March 11, 2008 || Mount Lemmon || Mount Lemmon Survey ||  || align=right | 2.2 km || 
|-id=002 bgcolor=#d6d6d6
| 528002 ||  || — || March 11, 2008 || Kitt Peak || Spacewatch || VER || align=right | 2.1 km || 
|-id=003 bgcolor=#fefefe
| 528003 ||  || — || March 7, 2008 || Mount Lemmon || Mount Lemmon Survey || NYS || align=right data-sort-value="0.51" | 510 m || 
|-id=004 bgcolor=#d6d6d6
| 528004 ||  || — || March 12, 2008 || Mount Lemmon || Mount Lemmon Survey ||  || align=right | 2.3 km || 
|-id=005 bgcolor=#fefefe
| 528005 ||  || — || March 10, 2008 || Mount Lemmon || Mount Lemmon Survey ||  || align=right data-sort-value="0.78" | 780 m || 
|-id=006 bgcolor=#fefefe
| 528006 ||  || — || March 11, 2008 || Mount Lemmon || Mount Lemmon Survey ||  || align=right data-sort-value="0.66" | 660 m || 
|-id=007 bgcolor=#d6d6d6
| 528007 ||  || — || March 11, 2008 || Mount Lemmon || Mount Lemmon Survey || TIR || align=right | 2.3 km || 
|-id=008 bgcolor=#d6d6d6
| 528008 ||  || — || March 11, 2008 || Kitt Peak || Spacewatch ||  || align=right | 2.3 km || 
|-id=009 bgcolor=#d6d6d6
| 528009 ||  || — || March 4, 2008 || Mount Lemmon || Mount Lemmon Survey ||  || align=right | 2.2 km || 
|-id=010 bgcolor=#d6d6d6
| 528010 ||  || — || February 9, 2008 || Mount Lemmon || Mount Lemmon Survey || THM || align=right | 2.0 km || 
|-id=011 bgcolor=#d6d6d6
| 528011 ||  || — || March 13, 2008 || Kitt Peak || Spacewatch || EOS || align=right | 1.4 km || 
|-id=012 bgcolor=#d6d6d6
| 528012 ||  || — || March 13, 2008 || Kitt Peak || Spacewatch ||  || align=right | 2.4 km || 
|-id=013 bgcolor=#d6d6d6
| 528013 ||  || — || March 5, 2008 || Mount Lemmon || Mount Lemmon Survey ||  || align=right | 2.6 km || 
|-id=014 bgcolor=#C2FFFF
| 528014 ||  || — || March 11, 2008 || Kitt Peak || Spacewatch || L5 || align=right | 8.1 km || 
|-id=015 bgcolor=#d6d6d6
| 528015 ||  || — || March 11, 2008 || Mount Lemmon || Mount Lemmon Survey ||  || align=right | 2.8 km || 
|-id=016 bgcolor=#d6d6d6
| 528016 ||  || — || March 2, 2008 || Kitt Peak || Spacewatch ||  || align=right | 2.5 km || 
|-id=017 bgcolor=#fefefe
| 528017 ||  || — || February 11, 2008 || Kitt Peak || Spacewatch ||  || align=right data-sort-value="0.87" | 870 m || 
|-id=018 bgcolor=#d6d6d6
| 528018 ||  || — || March 3, 2008 || XuYi || PMO NEO ||  || align=right | 2.6 km || 
|-id=019 bgcolor=#d6d6d6
| 528019 ||  || — || March 7, 2008 || Catalina || CSS ||  || align=right | 3.1 km || 
|-id=020 bgcolor=#d6d6d6
| 528020 ||  || — || March 11, 2008 || Mount Lemmon || Mount Lemmon Survey ||  || align=right | 2.8 km || 
|-id=021 bgcolor=#E9E9E9
| 528021 ||  || — || March 10, 2008 || Kitt Peak || Spacewatch ||  || align=right | 1.2 km || 
|-id=022 bgcolor=#fefefe
| 528022 ||  || — || March 8, 2008 || Kitt Peak || Spacewatch ||  || align=right data-sort-value="0.87" | 870 m || 
|-id=023 bgcolor=#fefefe
| 528023 ||  || — || March 1, 2008 || Kitt Peak || Spacewatch ||  || align=right data-sort-value="0.86" | 860 m || 
|-id=024 bgcolor=#fefefe
| 528024 ||  || — || March 6, 2008 || Catalina || CSS ||  || align=right data-sort-value="0.56" | 560 m || 
|-id=025 bgcolor=#d6d6d6
| 528025 ||  || — || February 13, 2008 || Kitt Peak || Spacewatch ||  || align=right | 2.4 km || 
|-id=026 bgcolor=#fefefe
| 528026 ||  || — || February 9, 2008 || Kitt Peak || Spacewatch ||  || align=right data-sort-value="0.68" | 680 m || 
|-id=027 bgcolor=#d6d6d6
| 528027 ||  || — || February 27, 2008 || Kitt Peak || Spacewatch ||  || align=right | 2.9 km || 
|-id=028 bgcolor=#fefefe
| 528028 ||  || — || February 8, 2008 || Kitt Peak || Spacewatch || NYS || align=right data-sort-value="0.46" | 460 m || 
|-id=029 bgcolor=#d6d6d6
| 528029 ||  || — || February 8, 2008 || Kitt Peak || Spacewatch ||  || align=right | 2.1 km || 
|-id=030 bgcolor=#fefefe
| 528030 ||  || — || February 8, 2008 || Kitt Peak || Spacewatch ||  || align=right data-sort-value="0.60" | 600 m || 
|-id=031 bgcolor=#fefefe
| 528031 ||  || — || February 28, 2008 || Kitt Peak || Spacewatch ||  || align=right data-sort-value="0.56" | 560 m || 
|-id=032 bgcolor=#d6d6d6
| 528032 ||  || — || March 27, 2008 || Mount Lemmon || Mount Lemmon Survey ||  || align=right | 2.2 km || 
|-id=033 bgcolor=#fefefe
| 528033 ||  || — || March 6, 2008 || Kitt Peak || Spacewatch || NYS || align=right data-sort-value="0.65" | 650 m || 
|-id=034 bgcolor=#d6d6d6
| 528034 ||  || — || March 27, 2008 || Kitt Peak || Spacewatch ||  || align=right | 2.8 km || 
|-id=035 bgcolor=#fefefe
| 528035 ||  || — || March 27, 2008 || Kitt Peak || Spacewatch ||  || align=right data-sort-value="0.75" | 750 m || 
|-id=036 bgcolor=#d6d6d6
| 528036 ||  || — || February 28, 2008 || Mount Lemmon || Mount Lemmon Survey ||  || align=right | 2.2 km || 
|-id=037 bgcolor=#d6d6d6
| 528037 ||  || — || February 2, 2008 || Mount Lemmon || Mount Lemmon Survey ||  || align=right | 2.5 km || 
|-id=038 bgcolor=#fefefe
| 528038 ||  || — || March 10, 2008 || Mount Lemmon || Mount Lemmon Survey ||  || align=right data-sort-value="0.57" | 570 m || 
|-id=039 bgcolor=#E9E9E9
| 528039 ||  || — || March 28, 2008 || Kitt Peak || Spacewatch ||  || align=right | 1.4 km || 
|-id=040 bgcolor=#fefefe
| 528040 ||  || — || March 10, 2008 || Kitt Peak || Spacewatch ||  || align=right data-sort-value="0.48" | 480 m || 
|-id=041 bgcolor=#fefefe
| 528041 ||  || — || March 6, 2008 || Kitt Peak || Spacewatch ||  || align=right data-sort-value="0.68" | 680 m || 
|-id=042 bgcolor=#E9E9E9
| 528042 ||  || — || March 28, 2008 || Kitt Peak || Spacewatch ||  || align=right | 1.4 km || 
|-id=043 bgcolor=#fefefe
| 528043 ||  || — || March 28, 2008 || Mount Lemmon || Mount Lemmon Survey || MAS || align=right data-sort-value="0.56" | 560 m || 
|-id=044 bgcolor=#d6d6d6
| 528044 ||  || — || March 11, 2008 || Mount Lemmon || Mount Lemmon Survey ||  || align=right | 2.8 km || 
|-id=045 bgcolor=#fefefe
| 528045 ||  || — || March 8, 2008 || Kitt Peak || Spacewatch ||  || align=right data-sort-value="0.65" | 650 m || 
|-id=046 bgcolor=#fefefe
| 528046 ||  || — || March 12, 2008 || Kitt Peak || Spacewatch || MAS || align=right data-sort-value="0.58" | 580 m || 
|-id=047 bgcolor=#fefefe
| 528047 ||  || — || March 28, 2008 || Mount Lemmon || Mount Lemmon Survey ||  || align=right data-sort-value="0.60" | 600 m || 
|-id=048 bgcolor=#fefefe
| 528048 ||  || — || March 28, 2008 || Mount Lemmon || Mount Lemmon Survey ||  || align=right data-sort-value="0.70" | 700 m || 
|-id=049 bgcolor=#d6d6d6
| 528049 ||  || — || March 28, 2008 || Kitt Peak || Spacewatch ||  || align=right | 2.8 km || 
|-id=050 bgcolor=#fefefe
| 528050 ||  || — || February 26, 2008 || Mount Lemmon || Mount Lemmon Survey ||  || align=right data-sort-value="0.63" | 630 m || 
|-id=051 bgcolor=#E9E9E9
| 528051 ||  || — || February 2, 2008 || Mount Lemmon || Mount Lemmon Survey || EUN || align=right | 1.1 km || 
|-id=052 bgcolor=#d6d6d6
| 528052 ||  || — || February 10, 2008 || Kitt Peak || Spacewatch || EUP || align=right | 2.0 km || 
|-id=053 bgcolor=#d6d6d6
| 528053 ||  || — || March 28, 2008 || Kitt Peak || Spacewatch ||  || align=right | 2.2 km || 
|-id=054 bgcolor=#fefefe
| 528054 ||  || — || March 28, 2008 || Mount Lemmon || Mount Lemmon Survey ||  || align=right data-sort-value="0.74" | 740 m || 
|-id=055 bgcolor=#E9E9E9
| 528055 ||  || — || March 28, 2008 || Kitt Peak || Spacewatch ||  || align=right | 1.7 km || 
|-id=056 bgcolor=#d6d6d6
| 528056 ||  || — || October 28, 2005 || Mount Lemmon || Mount Lemmon Survey ||  || align=right | 2.8 km || 
|-id=057 bgcolor=#d6d6d6
| 528057 ||  || — || March 27, 2008 || Mount Lemmon || Mount Lemmon Survey ||  || align=right | 2.1 km || 
|-id=058 bgcolor=#d6d6d6
| 528058 ||  || — || March 27, 2008 || Mount Lemmon || Mount Lemmon Survey ||  || align=right | 2.0 km || 
|-id=059 bgcolor=#fefefe
| 528059 ||  || — || March 27, 2008 || Mount Lemmon || Mount Lemmon Survey ||  || align=right data-sort-value="0.61" | 610 m || 
|-id=060 bgcolor=#d6d6d6
| 528060 ||  || — || March 4, 2008 || Mount Lemmon || Mount Lemmon Survey || HYG || align=right | 2.3 km || 
|-id=061 bgcolor=#d6d6d6
| 528061 ||  || — || March 5, 2008 || Kitt Peak || Spacewatch ||  || align=right | 2.6 km || 
|-id=062 bgcolor=#d6d6d6
| 528062 ||  || — || January 18, 2008 || Kitt Peak || Spacewatch ||  || align=right | 2.3 km || 
|-id=063 bgcolor=#d6d6d6
| 528063 ||  || — || February 8, 2008 || Kitt Peak || Spacewatch ||  || align=right | 2.4 km || 
|-id=064 bgcolor=#d6d6d6
| 528064 ||  || — || February 7, 2008 || Kitt Peak || Spacewatch ||  || align=right | 2.6 km || 
|-id=065 bgcolor=#d6d6d6
| 528065 ||  || — || March 29, 2008 || Kitt Peak || Spacewatch || TIR || align=right | 2.2 km || 
|-id=066 bgcolor=#fefefe
| 528066 ||  || — || March 29, 2008 || Kitt Peak || Spacewatch ||  || align=right data-sort-value="0.68" | 680 m || 
|-id=067 bgcolor=#d6d6d6
| 528067 ||  || — || March 30, 2008 || Kitt Peak || Spacewatch ||  || align=right | 2.1 km || 
|-id=068 bgcolor=#d6d6d6
| 528068 ||  || — || March 30, 2008 || Kitt Peak || Spacewatch ||  || align=right | 2.7 km || 
|-id=069 bgcolor=#d6d6d6
| 528069 ||  || — || March 30, 2008 || Kitt Peak || Spacewatch ||  || align=right | 2.2 km || 
|-id=070 bgcolor=#d6d6d6
| 528070 ||  || — || March 30, 2008 || Kitt Peak || Spacewatch ||  || align=right | 2.2 km || 
|-id=071 bgcolor=#fefefe
| 528071 ||  || — || March 30, 2008 || Kitt Peak || Spacewatch ||  || align=right data-sort-value="0.69" | 690 m || 
|-id=072 bgcolor=#d6d6d6
| 528072 ||  || — || February 29, 2008 || Kitt Peak || Spacewatch ||  || align=right | 2.3 km || 
|-id=073 bgcolor=#fefefe
| 528073 ||  || — || March 31, 2008 || Kitt Peak || Spacewatch ||  || align=right data-sort-value="0.52" | 520 m || 
|-id=074 bgcolor=#d6d6d6
| 528074 ||  || — || March 30, 2008 || Socorro || LINEAR || THB || align=right | 3.9 km || 
|-id=075 bgcolor=#fefefe
| 528075 ||  || — || March 31, 2008 || Mount Lemmon || Mount Lemmon Survey || NYS || align=right data-sort-value="0.55" | 550 m || 
|-id=076 bgcolor=#d6d6d6
| 528076 ||  || — || March 31, 2008 || Mount Lemmon || Mount Lemmon Survey ||  || align=right | 2.4 km || 
|-id=077 bgcolor=#d6d6d6
| 528077 ||  || — || March 31, 2008 || Kitt Peak || Spacewatch ||  || align=right | 2.7 km || 
|-id=078 bgcolor=#fefefe
| 528078 ||  || — || March 31, 2008 || Kitt Peak || Spacewatch ||  || align=right | 1.0 km || 
|-id=079 bgcolor=#d6d6d6
| 528079 ||  || — || March 31, 2008 || Mount Lemmon || Mount Lemmon Survey ||  || align=right | 2.9 km || 
|-id=080 bgcolor=#d6d6d6
| 528080 ||  || — || February 28, 2008 || Kitt Peak || Spacewatch ||  || align=right | 2.5 km || 
|-id=081 bgcolor=#E9E9E9
| 528081 ||  || — || March 14, 2008 || Catalina || CSS ||  || align=right | 1.3 km || 
|-id=082 bgcolor=#d6d6d6
| 528082 ||  || — || March 28, 2008 || Mount Lemmon || Mount Lemmon Survey ||  || align=right | 2.5 km || 
|-id=083 bgcolor=#E9E9E9
| 528083 ||  || — || March 28, 2008 || Kitt Peak || Spacewatch ||  || align=right | 1.8 km || 
|-id=084 bgcolor=#fefefe
| 528084 ||  || — || March 29, 2008 || Kitt Peak || Spacewatch ||  || align=right data-sort-value="0.69" | 690 m || 
|-id=085 bgcolor=#E9E9E9
| 528085 ||  || — || March 30, 2008 || Kitt Peak || Spacewatch ||  || align=right | 1.9 km || 
|-id=086 bgcolor=#C2FFFF
| 528086 ||  || — || March 31, 2008 || Kitt Peak || Spacewatch || L5 || align=right | 7.7 km || 
|-id=087 bgcolor=#d6d6d6
| 528087 ||  || — || March 31, 2008 || Kitt Peak || Spacewatch ||  || align=right | 2.3 km || 
|-id=088 bgcolor=#C2FFFF
| 528088 ||  || — || March 31, 2008 || Kitt Peak || Spacewatch || L5 || align=right | 7.1 km || 
|-id=089 bgcolor=#E9E9E9
| 528089 ||  || — || March 29, 2008 || Mount Lemmon || Mount Lemmon Survey ||  || align=right | 1.7 km || 
|-id=090 bgcolor=#d6d6d6
| 528090 ||  || — || March 31, 2008 || Mount Lemmon || Mount Lemmon Survey ||  || align=right | 2.4 km || 
|-id=091 bgcolor=#E9E9E9
| 528091 ||  || — || March 27, 2008 || Mount Lemmon || Mount Lemmon Survey ||  || align=right | 1.5 km || 
|-id=092 bgcolor=#d6d6d6
| 528092 ||  || — || March 31, 2008 || Mount Lemmon || Mount Lemmon Survey ||  || align=right | 2.9 km || 
|-id=093 bgcolor=#fefefe
| 528093 ||  || — || March 10, 2008 || Kitt Peak || Spacewatch ||  || align=right data-sort-value="0.53" | 530 m || 
|-id=094 bgcolor=#fefefe
| 528094 ||  || — || March 3, 2008 || XuYi || PMO NEO ||  || align=right data-sort-value="0.67" | 670 m || 
|-id=095 bgcolor=#fefefe
| 528095 ||  || — || April 1, 2008 || Mount Lemmon || Mount Lemmon Survey ||  || align=right data-sort-value="0.75" | 750 m || 
|-id=096 bgcolor=#fefefe
| 528096 ||  || — || March 4, 2008 || Mount Lemmon || Mount Lemmon Survey || NYS || align=right data-sort-value="0.49" | 490 m || 
|-id=097 bgcolor=#d6d6d6
| 528097 ||  || — || April 8, 2008 || Desert Eagle || W. K. Y. Yeung ||  || align=right | 2.3 km || 
|-id=098 bgcolor=#fefefe
| 528098 ||  || — || April 5, 2008 || Mount Lemmon || Mount Lemmon Survey ||  || align=right data-sort-value="0.72" | 720 m || 
|-id=099 bgcolor=#fefefe
| 528099 ||  || — || February 13, 2008 || Kitt Peak || Spacewatch ||  || align=right | 1.1 km || 
|-id=100 bgcolor=#d6d6d6
| 528100 ||  || — || March 5, 2008 || Kitt Peak || Spacewatch ||  || align=right | 2.5 km || 
|}

528101–528200 

|-bgcolor=#E9E9E9
| 528101 ||  || — || April 3, 2008 || Catalina || CSS ||  || align=right | 2.2 km || 
|-id=102 bgcolor=#fefefe
| 528102 ||  || — || March 5, 2008 || Kitt Peak || Spacewatch ||  || align=right data-sort-value="0.54" | 540 m || 
|-id=103 bgcolor=#d6d6d6
| 528103 ||  || — || April 3, 2008 || Mount Lemmon || Mount Lemmon Survey ||  || align=right | 1.9 km || 
|-id=104 bgcolor=#d6d6d6
| 528104 ||  || — || April 3, 2008 || Kitt Peak || Spacewatch ||  || align=right | 2.4 km || 
|-id=105 bgcolor=#d6d6d6
| 528105 ||  || — || March 30, 2008 || Kitt Peak || Spacewatch ||  || align=right | 2.3 km || 
|-id=106 bgcolor=#fefefe
| 528106 ||  || — || March 15, 2008 || Mount Lemmon || Mount Lemmon Survey ||  || align=right data-sort-value="0.65" | 650 m || 
|-id=107 bgcolor=#fefefe
| 528107 ||  || — || March 2, 2008 || Kitt Peak || Spacewatch || NYS || align=right data-sort-value="0.56" | 560 m || 
|-id=108 bgcolor=#d6d6d6
| 528108 ||  || — || April 3, 2008 || Kitt Peak || Spacewatch || HYG || align=right | 2.9 km || 
|-id=109 bgcolor=#E9E9E9
| 528109 ||  || — || April 4, 2008 || Kitt Peak || Spacewatch ||  || align=right | 1.6 km || 
|-id=110 bgcolor=#C2FFFF
| 528110 ||  || — || April 4, 2008 || Kitt Peak || Spacewatch || L5 || align=right | 8.7 km || 
|-id=111 bgcolor=#d6d6d6
| 528111 ||  || — || April 5, 2008 || Mount Lemmon || Mount Lemmon Survey ||  || align=right | 2.1 km || 
|-id=112 bgcolor=#d6d6d6
| 528112 ||  || — || April 5, 2008 || Kitt Peak || Spacewatch ||  || align=right | 2.0 km || 
|-id=113 bgcolor=#fefefe
| 528113 ||  || — || March 2, 2008 || Kitt Peak || Spacewatch ||  || align=right data-sort-value="0.58" | 580 m || 
|-id=114 bgcolor=#C2FFFF
| 528114 ||  || — || April 1, 2008 || Kitt Peak || Spacewatch || L5 || align=right | 7.8 km || 
|-id=115 bgcolor=#fefefe
| 528115 ||  || — || March 6, 2008 || Kitt Peak || Spacewatch ||  || align=right data-sort-value="0.66" | 660 m || 
|-id=116 bgcolor=#fefefe
| 528116 ||  || — || March 28, 2008 || Mount Lemmon || Mount Lemmon Survey || MAS || align=right data-sort-value="0.75" | 750 m || 
|-id=117 bgcolor=#d6d6d6
| 528117 ||  || — || April 5, 2008 || Mount Lemmon || Mount Lemmon Survey ||  || align=right | 2.6 km || 
|-id=118 bgcolor=#fefefe
| 528118 ||  || — || March 31, 2008 || Kitt Peak || Spacewatch ||  || align=right | 1.4 km || 
|-id=119 bgcolor=#d6d6d6
| 528119 ||  || — || March 12, 2008 || Kitt Peak || Spacewatch ||  || align=right | 2.1 km || 
|-id=120 bgcolor=#fefefe
| 528120 ||  || — || March 29, 2008 || Kitt Peak || Spacewatch ||  || align=right data-sort-value="0.60" | 600 m || 
|-id=121 bgcolor=#fefefe
| 528121 ||  || — || April 6, 2008 || Kitt Peak || Spacewatch ||  || align=right data-sort-value="0.65" | 650 m || 
|-id=122 bgcolor=#d6d6d6
| 528122 ||  || — || April 7, 2008 || Kitt Peak || Spacewatch ||  || align=right | 2.8 km || 
|-id=123 bgcolor=#d6d6d6
| 528123 ||  || — || March 30, 2008 || Kitt Peak || Spacewatch ||  || align=right | 2.5 km || 
|-id=124 bgcolor=#fefefe
| 528124 ||  || — || April 7, 2008 || Kitt Peak || Spacewatch ||  || align=right data-sort-value="0.64" | 640 m || 
|-id=125 bgcolor=#E9E9E9
| 528125 ||  || — || March 31, 2008 || Mount Lemmon || Mount Lemmon Survey ||  || align=right | 1.0 km || 
|-id=126 bgcolor=#d6d6d6
| 528126 ||  || — || April 8, 2008 || Kitt Peak || Spacewatch || EOS || align=right | 1.6 km || 
|-id=127 bgcolor=#d6d6d6
| 528127 ||  || — || March 28, 2008 || Kitt Peak || Spacewatch ||  || align=right | 2.7 km || 
|-id=128 bgcolor=#E9E9E9
| 528128 ||  || — || October 22, 2006 || Catalina || CSS ||  || align=right data-sort-value="0.91" | 910 m || 
|-id=129 bgcolor=#d6d6d6
| 528129 ||  || — || March 29, 2008 || Mount Lemmon || Mount Lemmon Survey || HYG || align=right | 2.2 km || 
|-id=130 bgcolor=#E9E9E9
| 528130 ||  || — || March 13, 2008 || Kitt Peak || Spacewatch ||  || align=right | 2.4 km || 
|-id=131 bgcolor=#E9E9E9
| 528131 ||  || — || March 28, 2008 || Kitt Peak || Spacewatch ||  || align=right | 1.3 km || 
|-id=132 bgcolor=#fefefe
| 528132 ||  || — || March 29, 2008 || Mount Lemmon || Mount Lemmon Survey ||  || align=right data-sort-value="0.68" | 680 m || 
|-id=133 bgcolor=#fefefe
| 528133 ||  || — || April 8, 2008 || Kitt Peak || Spacewatch ||  || align=right data-sort-value="0.71" | 710 m || 
|-id=134 bgcolor=#fefefe
| 528134 ||  || — || April 9, 2008 || Kitt Peak || Spacewatch || H || align=right data-sort-value="0.59" | 590 m || 
|-id=135 bgcolor=#fefefe
| 528135 ||  || — || February 27, 2008 || Mount Lemmon || Mount Lemmon Survey ||  || align=right data-sort-value="0.77" | 770 m || 
|-id=136 bgcolor=#d6d6d6
| 528136 ||  || — || February 12, 2008 || Mount Lemmon || Mount Lemmon Survey || THB || align=right | 2.4 km || 
|-id=137 bgcolor=#d6d6d6
| 528137 ||  || — || April 14, 2008 || Catalina || CSS || Tj (2.98) || align=right | 3.2 km || 
|-id=138 bgcolor=#fefefe
| 528138 ||  || — || April 13, 2008 || Kitt Peak || Spacewatch || NYS || align=right data-sort-value="0.69" | 690 m || 
|-id=139 bgcolor=#d6d6d6
| 528139 ||  || — || April 13, 2008 || Kitt Peak || Spacewatch ||  || align=right | 2.2 km || 
|-id=140 bgcolor=#d6d6d6
| 528140 ||  || — || April 14, 2008 || Mount Lemmon || Mount Lemmon Survey ||  || align=right | 2.3 km || 
|-id=141 bgcolor=#E9E9E9
| 528141 ||  || — || April 14, 2008 || Mount Lemmon || Mount Lemmon Survey ||  || align=right | 1.5 km || 
|-id=142 bgcolor=#d6d6d6
| 528142 ||  || — || April 5, 2008 || Mount Lemmon || Mount Lemmon Survey ||  || align=right | 3.1 km || 
|-id=143 bgcolor=#fefefe
| 528143 ||  || — || April 7, 2008 || Kitt Peak || Spacewatch ||  || align=right data-sort-value="0.79" | 790 m || 
|-id=144 bgcolor=#fefefe
| 528144 ||  || — || April 4, 2008 || Kitt Peak || Spacewatch ||  || align=right data-sort-value="0.62" | 620 m || 
|-id=145 bgcolor=#d6d6d6
| 528145 ||  || — || April 11, 2008 || Kitt Peak || Spacewatch ||  || align=right | 2.5 km || 
|-id=146 bgcolor=#d6d6d6
| 528146 ||  || — || April 6, 2008 || Kitt Peak || Spacewatch ||  || align=right | 2.0 km || 
|-id=147 bgcolor=#d6d6d6
| 528147 ||  || — || April 15, 2008 || Mount Lemmon || Mount Lemmon Survey ||  || align=right | 2.5 km || 
|-id=148 bgcolor=#C2FFFF
| 528148 ||  || — || April 1, 2008 || Kitt Peak || Spacewatch || L5 || align=right | 6.7 km || 
|-id=149 bgcolor=#d6d6d6
| 528149 ||  || — || March 31, 2008 || Catalina || CSS ||  || align=right | 3.1 km || 
|-id=150 bgcolor=#fefefe
| 528150 ||  || — || April 19, 2004 || Kitt Peak || Spacewatch ||  || align=right data-sort-value="0.90" | 900 m || 
|-id=151 bgcolor=#fefefe
| 528151 ||  || — || April 3, 2008 || Mount Lemmon || Mount Lemmon Survey ||  || align=right data-sort-value="0.75" | 750 m || 
|-id=152 bgcolor=#fefefe
| 528152 ||  || — || April 13, 2008 || Kitt Peak || Spacewatch ||  || align=right data-sort-value="0.69" | 690 m || 
|-id=153 bgcolor=#fefefe
| 528153 ||  || — || April 6, 2008 || Kitt Peak || Spacewatch ||  || align=right data-sort-value="0.85" | 850 m || 
|-id=154 bgcolor=#d6d6d6
| 528154 ||  || — || April 6, 2008 || Mount Lemmon || Mount Lemmon Survey ||  || align=right | 2.8 km || 
|-id=155 bgcolor=#d6d6d6
| 528155 ||  || — || April 1, 2008 || Mount Lemmon || Mount Lemmon Survey ||  || align=right | 2.4 km || 
|-id=156 bgcolor=#d6d6d6
| 528156 ||  || — || April 5, 2008 || Mount Lemmon || Mount Lemmon Survey ||  || align=right | 2.8 km || 
|-id=157 bgcolor=#d6d6d6
| 528157 ||  || — || January 28, 2007 || Mount Lemmon || Mount Lemmon Survey ||  || align=right | 2.7 km || 
|-id=158 bgcolor=#fefefe
| 528158 ||  || — || March 27, 2008 || Kitt Peak || Spacewatch ||  || align=right data-sort-value="0.78" | 780 m || 
|-id=159 bgcolor=#FFC2E0
| 528159 ||  || — || April 30, 2008 || Catalina || CSS || AMOPHA || align=right data-sort-value="0.17" | 170 m || 
|-id=160 bgcolor=#fefefe
| 528160 ||  || — || April 9, 2008 || Kitt Peak || Spacewatch ||  || align=right data-sort-value="0.55" | 550 m || 
|-id=161 bgcolor=#d6d6d6
| 528161 ||  || — || April 24, 2008 || Kitt Peak || Spacewatch ||  || align=right | 2.6 km || 
|-id=162 bgcolor=#d6d6d6
| 528162 ||  || — || April 24, 2008 || Kitt Peak || Spacewatch ||  || align=right | 3.1 km || 
|-id=163 bgcolor=#C2FFFF
| 528163 ||  || — || April 24, 2008 || Kitt Peak || Spacewatch || L5 || align=right | 11 km || 
|-id=164 bgcolor=#d6d6d6
| 528164 ||  || — || April 5, 2008 || Mount Lemmon || Mount Lemmon Survey ||  || align=right | 2.5 km || 
|-id=165 bgcolor=#E9E9E9
| 528165 ||  || — || April 26, 2008 || Kitt Peak || Spacewatch ||  || align=right | 1.8 km || 
|-id=166 bgcolor=#fefefe
| 528166 ||  || — || March 31, 2008 || Kitt Peak || Spacewatch ||  || align=right data-sort-value="0.57" | 570 m || 
|-id=167 bgcolor=#d6d6d6
| 528167 ||  || — || April 26, 2008 || Kitt Peak || Spacewatch || URS || align=right | 2.8 km || 
|-id=168 bgcolor=#d6d6d6
| 528168 ||  || — || April 26, 2008 || Kitt Peak || Spacewatch || THB || align=right | 1.9 km || 
|-id=169 bgcolor=#E9E9E9
| 528169 ||  || — || April 27, 2008 || Kitt Peak || Spacewatch ||  || align=right | 1.5 km || 
|-id=170 bgcolor=#d6d6d6
| 528170 ||  || — || April 27, 2008 || Kitt Peak || Spacewatch ||  || align=right | 2.9 km || 
|-id=171 bgcolor=#E9E9E9
| 528171 ||  || — || April 6, 2008 || Kitt Peak || Spacewatch ||  || align=right data-sort-value="0.83" | 830 m || 
|-id=172 bgcolor=#E9E9E9
| 528172 ||  || — || March 30, 2008 || Kitt Peak || Spacewatch ||  || align=right | 1.4 km || 
|-id=173 bgcolor=#fefefe
| 528173 ||  || — || March 5, 2008 || Kitt Peak || Spacewatch ||  || align=right data-sort-value="0.62" | 620 m || 
|-id=174 bgcolor=#fefefe
| 528174 ||  || — || April 14, 2008 || Kitt Peak || Spacewatch ||  || align=right data-sort-value="0.76" | 760 m || 
|-id=175 bgcolor=#d6d6d6
| 528175 ||  || — || April 29, 2008 || Mount Lemmon || Mount Lemmon Survey || VER || align=right | 2.3 km || 
|-id=176 bgcolor=#d6d6d6
| 528176 ||  || — || April 26, 2008 || Mount Lemmon || Mount Lemmon Survey ||  || align=right | 2.3 km || 
|-id=177 bgcolor=#fefefe
| 528177 ||  || — || March 13, 2008 || Kitt Peak || Spacewatch || H || align=right data-sort-value="0.57" | 570 m || 
|-id=178 bgcolor=#fefefe
| 528178 ||  || — || March 30, 2008 || Kitt Peak || Spacewatch ||  || align=right data-sort-value="0.59" | 590 m || 
|-id=179 bgcolor=#fefefe
| 528179 ||  || — || April 15, 2008 || Mount Lemmon || Mount Lemmon Survey ||  || align=right data-sort-value="0.72" | 720 m || 
|-id=180 bgcolor=#fefefe
| 528180 ||  || — || April 28, 2008 || Kitt Peak || Spacewatch ||  || align=right data-sort-value="0.94" | 940 m || 
|-id=181 bgcolor=#fefefe
| 528181 ||  || — || April 29, 2008 || Kitt Peak || Spacewatch || NYS || align=right data-sort-value="0.59" | 590 m || 
|-id=182 bgcolor=#fefefe
| 528182 ||  || — || April 29, 2008 || Kitt Peak || Spacewatch ||  || align=right data-sort-value="0.73" | 730 m || 
|-id=183 bgcolor=#E9E9E9
| 528183 ||  || — || April 29, 2008 || Kitt Peak || Spacewatch ||  || align=right data-sort-value="0.97" | 970 m || 
|-id=184 bgcolor=#FA8072
| 528184 ||  || — || February 28, 2008 || Kitt Peak || Spacewatch ||  || align=right data-sort-value="0.56" | 560 m || 
|-id=185 bgcolor=#d6d6d6
| 528185 ||  || — || April 1, 2008 || Mount Lemmon || Mount Lemmon Survey ||  || align=right | 2.8 km || 
|-id=186 bgcolor=#d6d6d6
| 528186 ||  || — || April 28, 2008 || Mount Lemmon || Mount Lemmon Survey ||  || align=right | 2.9 km || 
|-id=187 bgcolor=#d6d6d6
| 528187 ||  || — || April 30, 2008 || Kitt Peak || Spacewatch ||  || align=right | 2.5 km || 
|-id=188 bgcolor=#d6d6d6
| 528188 ||  || — || April 30, 2008 || Kitt Peak || Spacewatch ||  || align=right | 2.7 km || 
|-id=189 bgcolor=#d6d6d6
| 528189 ||  || — || April 24, 2008 || Kitt Peak || Spacewatch || LIX || align=right | 2.8 km || 
|-id=190 bgcolor=#d6d6d6
| 528190 ||  || — || April 29, 2008 || Mount Lemmon || Mount Lemmon Survey ||  || align=right | 2.6 km || 
|-id=191 bgcolor=#d6d6d6
| 528191 ||  || — || April 28, 2008 || Mount Lemmon || Mount Lemmon Survey ||  || align=right | 2.3 km || 
|-id=192 bgcolor=#fefefe
| 528192 ||  || — || March 27, 2008 || Mount Lemmon || Mount Lemmon Survey ||  || align=right data-sort-value="0.72" | 720 m || 
|-id=193 bgcolor=#d6d6d6
| 528193 ||  || — || March 15, 2008 || Mount Lemmon || Mount Lemmon Survey ||  || align=right | 2.8 km || 
|-id=194 bgcolor=#fefefe
| 528194 ||  || — || May 3, 2008 || Kitt Peak || Spacewatch ||  || align=right data-sort-value="0.76" | 760 m || 
|-id=195 bgcolor=#d6d6d6
| 528195 ||  || — || April 3, 2008 || Mount Lemmon || Mount Lemmon Survey ||  || align=right | 2.3 km || 
|-id=196 bgcolor=#d6d6d6
| 528196 ||  || — || May 7, 2008 || Mount Lemmon || Mount Lemmon Survey ||  || align=right | 3.0 km || 
|-id=197 bgcolor=#E9E9E9
| 528197 ||  || — || March 27, 2008 || Mount Lemmon || Mount Lemmon Survey ||  || align=right | 1.0 km || 
|-id=198 bgcolor=#fefefe
| 528198 ||  || — || April 29, 2008 || Kitt Peak || Spacewatch ||  || align=right data-sort-value="0.71" | 710 m || 
|-id=199 bgcolor=#fefefe
| 528199 ||  || — || May 7, 2008 || Kitt Peak || Spacewatch ||  || align=right data-sort-value="0.48" | 480 m || 
|-id=200 bgcolor=#fefefe
| 528200 ||  || — || May 7, 2008 || Kitt Peak || Spacewatch || MAS || align=right data-sort-value="0.74" | 740 m || 
|}

528201–528300 

|-bgcolor=#FA8072
| 528201 ||  || — || March 11, 2008 || Catalina || CSS ||  || align=right data-sort-value="0.87" | 870 m || 
|-id=202 bgcolor=#d6d6d6
| 528202 ||  || — || May 11, 2008 || Mount Lemmon || Mount Lemmon Survey ||  || align=right | 2.5 km || 
|-id=203 bgcolor=#d6d6d6
| 528203 ||  || — || May 13, 2008 || Mount Lemmon || Mount Lemmon Survey ||  || align=right | 2.2 km || 
|-id=204 bgcolor=#d6d6d6
| 528204 ||  || — || May 7, 2008 || Catalina || CSS ||  || align=right | 2.8 km || 
|-id=205 bgcolor=#FA8072
| 528205 ||  || — || May 5, 2008 || Mount Lemmon || Mount Lemmon Survey ||  || align=right data-sort-value="0.54" | 540 m || 
|-id=206 bgcolor=#d6d6d6
| 528206 ||  || — || May 3, 2008 || Kitt Peak || Spacewatch ||  || align=right | 2.4 km || 
|-id=207 bgcolor=#d6d6d6
| 528207 ||  || — || May 14, 2008 || Mount Lemmon || Mount Lemmon Survey ||  || align=right | 2.6 km || 
|-id=208 bgcolor=#E9E9E9
| 528208 ||  || — || May 6, 2008 || Mount Lemmon || Mount Lemmon Survey ||  || align=right | 1.6 km || 
|-id=209 bgcolor=#fefefe
| 528209 ||  || — || May 26, 2008 || Kitt Peak || Spacewatch ||  || align=right data-sort-value="0.65" | 650 m || 
|-id=210 bgcolor=#C2FFFF
| 528210 ||  || — || April 7, 2008 || Kitt Peak || Spacewatch || L5 || align=right | 8.0 km || 
|-id=211 bgcolor=#d6d6d6
| 528211 ||  || — || May 27, 2008 || Kitt Peak || Spacewatch ||  || align=right | 2.1 km || 
|-id=212 bgcolor=#E9E9E9
| 528212 ||  || — || May 28, 2008 || Kitt Peak || Spacewatch ||  || align=right | 2.0 km || 
|-id=213 bgcolor=#E9E9E9
| 528213 ||  || — || May 31, 2008 || Mount Lemmon || Mount Lemmon Survey || JUN || align=right | 1.1 km || 
|-id=214 bgcolor=#d6d6d6
| 528214 ||  || — || May 29, 2008 || Mount Lemmon || Mount Lemmon Survey || VER || align=right | 2.0 km || 
|-id=215 bgcolor=#C2FFFF
| 528215 ||  || — || May 29, 2008 || Kitt Peak || Spacewatch || L5 || align=right | 8.0 km || 
|-id=216 bgcolor=#d6d6d6
| 528216 ||  || — || May 30, 2008 || Kitt Peak || Spacewatch ||  || align=right | 3.4 km || 
|-id=217 bgcolor=#E9E9E9
| 528217 ||  || — || May 30, 2008 || Kitt Peak || Spacewatch ||  || align=right | 1.1 km || 
|-id=218 bgcolor=#d6d6d6
| 528218 ||  || — || May 5, 2008 || Mount Lemmon || Mount Lemmon Survey ||  || align=right | 2.5 km || 
|-id=219 bgcolor=#C2E0FF
| 528219 ||  || — || May 31, 2008 || Mauna Kea || Mauna Kea Obs. || centaurdamocloid || align=right | 77 km || 
|-id=220 bgcolor=#C2FFFF
| 528220 ||  || — || April 6, 2008 || Kitt Peak || Spacewatch || L5 || align=right | 8.3 km || 
|-id=221 bgcolor=#E9E9E9
| 528221 ||  || — || May 30, 2008 || Mount Lemmon || Mount Lemmon Survey ||  || align=right | 1.0 km || 
|-id=222 bgcolor=#fefefe
| 528222 ||  || — || March 29, 2008 || Kitt Peak || Spacewatch ||  || align=right data-sort-value="0.78" | 780 m || 
|-id=223 bgcolor=#E9E9E9
| 528223 ||  || — || May 13, 2008 || Mount Lemmon || Mount Lemmon Survey ||  || align=right | 1.5 km || 
|-id=224 bgcolor=#d6d6d6
| 528224 ||  || — || June 6, 2008 || Kitt Peak || Spacewatch ||  || align=right | 3.2 km || 
|-id=225 bgcolor=#d6d6d6
| 528225 ||  || — || May 5, 2008 || Mount Lemmon || Mount Lemmon Survey ||  || align=right | 2.7 km || 
|-id=226 bgcolor=#E9E9E9
| 528226 ||  || — || June 30, 2008 || Kitt Peak || Spacewatch ||  || align=right | 1.2 km || 
|-id=227 bgcolor=#fefefe
| 528227 ||  || — || June 30, 2008 || Kitt Peak || Spacewatch ||  || align=right data-sort-value="0.75" | 750 m || 
|-id=228 bgcolor=#E9E9E9
| 528228 ||  || — || August 9, 2004 || Anderson Mesa || LONEOS ||  || align=right | 1.1 km || 
|-id=229 bgcolor=#E9E9E9
| 528229 ||  || — || July 28, 2008 || La Sagra || OAM Obs. ||  || align=right | 1.8 km || 
|-id=230 bgcolor=#E9E9E9
| 528230 ||  || — || July 30, 2008 || Kitt Peak || Spacewatch ||  || align=right | 1.3 km || 
|-id=231 bgcolor=#FA8072
| 528231 ||  || — || July 28, 2008 || Catalina || CSS ||  || align=right data-sort-value="0.82" | 820 m || 
|-id=232 bgcolor=#E9E9E9
| 528232 ||  || — || July 31, 2008 || Mount Lemmon || Mount Lemmon Survey ||  || align=right | 2.7 km || 
|-id=233 bgcolor=#E9E9E9
| 528233 ||  || — || July 29, 2008 || Catalina || CSS ||  || align=right | 1.7 km || 
|-id=234 bgcolor=#E9E9E9
| 528234 ||  || — || August 20, 2008 || Kitt Peak || Spacewatch ||  || align=right data-sort-value="0.90" | 900 m || 
|-id=235 bgcolor=#FA8072
| 528235 ||  || — || August 26, 2008 || Socorro || LINEAR ||  || align=right data-sort-value="0.72" | 720 m || 
|-id=236 bgcolor=#E9E9E9
| 528236 ||  || — || August 24, 2008 || La Sagra || OAM Obs. ||  || align=right | 2.7 km || 
|-id=237 bgcolor=#E9E9E9
| 528237 ||  || — || August 4, 2008 || Siding Spring || SSS ||  || align=right | 1.1 km || 
|-id=238 bgcolor=#E9E9E9
| 528238 ||  || — || August 21, 2008 || Kitt Peak || Spacewatch ||  || align=right | 2.6 km || 
|-id=239 bgcolor=#E9E9E9
| 528239 ||  || — || August 24, 2008 || Kitt Peak || Spacewatch ||  || align=right | 1.4 km || 
|-id=240 bgcolor=#fefefe
| 528240 ||  || — || September 2, 2008 || Kitt Peak || Spacewatch ||  || align=right data-sort-value="0.54" | 540 m || 
|-id=241 bgcolor=#E9E9E9
| 528241 ||  || — || September 3, 2008 || Kitt Peak || Spacewatch ||  || align=right | 1.6 km || 
|-id=242 bgcolor=#d6d6d6
| 528242 ||  || — || September 3, 2008 || Kitt Peak || Spacewatch ||  || align=right | 1.7 km || 
|-id=243 bgcolor=#E9E9E9
| 528243 ||  || — || August 24, 2008 || Kitt Peak || Spacewatch ||  || align=right | 1.8 km || 
|-id=244 bgcolor=#E9E9E9
| 528244 ||  || — || August 24, 2008 || Socorro || LINEAR ||  || align=right | 2.2 km || 
|-id=245 bgcolor=#E9E9E9
| 528245 ||  || — || August 24, 2008 || Kitt Peak || Spacewatch ||  || align=right | 1.6 km || 
|-id=246 bgcolor=#E9E9E9
| 528246 ||  || — || September 2, 2008 || Kitt Peak || Spacewatch ||  || align=right | 1.9 km || 
|-id=247 bgcolor=#E9E9E9
| 528247 ||  || — || September 2, 2008 || Kitt Peak || Spacewatch ||  || align=right data-sort-value="0.81" | 810 m || 
|-id=248 bgcolor=#E9E9E9
| 528248 ||  || — || September 2, 2008 || Kitt Peak || Spacewatch ||  || align=right data-sort-value="0.83" | 830 m || 
|-id=249 bgcolor=#E9E9E9
| 528249 ||  || — || September 2, 2008 || Kitt Peak || Spacewatch ||  || align=right | 2.0 km || 
|-id=250 bgcolor=#E9E9E9
| 528250 ||  || — || August 19, 2008 || Siding Spring || SSS ||  || align=right | 1.7 km || 
|-id=251 bgcolor=#E9E9E9
| 528251 ||  || — || September 3, 2008 || Kitt Peak || Spacewatch ||  || align=right | 1.3 km || 
|-id=252 bgcolor=#fefefe
| 528252 ||  || — || August 21, 2008 || Kitt Peak || Spacewatch ||  || align=right data-sort-value="0.63" | 630 m || 
|-id=253 bgcolor=#E9E9E9
| 528253 ||  || — || September 5, 2008 || Kitt Peak || Spacewatch ||  || align=right | 1.3 km || 
|-id=254 bgcolor=#E9E9E9
| 528254 ||  || — || September 5, 2008 || Kitt Peak || Spacewatch ||  || align=right | 1.2 km || 
|-id=255 bgcolor=#fefefe
| 528255 ||  || — || September 2, 2008 || Kitt Peak || Spacewatch ||  || align=right data-sort-value="0.61" | 610 m || 
|-id=256 bgcolor=#E9E9E9
| 528256 ||  || — || September 3, 2008 || Kitt Peak || Spacewatch ||  || align=right | 1.5 km || 
|-id=257 bgcolor=#E9E9E9
| 528257 ||  || — || September 5, 2008 || Kitt Peak || Spacewatch ||  || align=right | 1.3 km || 
|-id=258 bgcolor=#E9E9E9
| 528258 ||  || — || September 5, 2008 || Kitt Peak || Spacewatch ||  || align=right | 2.3 km || 
|-id=259 bgcolor=#E9E9E9
| 528259 ||  || — || September 5, 2008 || Socorro || LINEAR ||  || align=right | 2.3 km || 
|-id=260 bgcolor=#E9E9E9
| 528260 ||  || — || September 7, 2008 || Mount Lemmon || Mount Lemmon Survey ||  || align=right | 2.2 km || 
|-id=261 bgcolor=#E9E9E9
| 528261 ||  || — || September 2, 2008 || Kitt Peak || Spacewatch ||  || align=right | 1.2 km || 
|-id=262 bgcolor=#d6d6d6
| 528262 ||  || — || September 2, 2008 || Kitt Peak || Spacewatch || KOR || align=right | 1.1 km || 
|-id=263 bgcolor=#d6d6d6
| 528263 ||  || — || September 5, 2008 || Kitt Peak || Spacewatch ||  || align=right | 2.1 km || 
|-id=264 bgcolor=#E9E9E9
| 528264 ||  || — || September 6, 2008 || Mount Lemmon || Mount Lemmon Survey ||  || align=right | 2.0 km || 
|-id=265 bgcolor=#d6d6d6
| 528265 ||  || — || September 6, 2008 || Kitt Peak || Spacewatch || KOR || align=right | 1.2 km || 
|-id=266 bgcolor=#E9E9E9
| 528266 ||  || — || September 6, 2008 || Kitt Peak || Spacewatch || MAR || align=right data-sort-value="0.70" | 700 m || 
|-id=267 bgcolor=#E9E9E9
| 528267 ||  || — || September 10, 2008 || Kitt Peak || Spacewatch ||  || align=right | 1.7 km || 
|-id=268 bgcolor=#E9E9E9
| 528268 ||  || — || September 4, 2008 || Kitt Peak || Spacewatch ||  || align=right | 1.3 km || 
|-id=269 bgcolor=#E9E9E9
| 528269 ||  || — || September 7, 2008 || Mount Lemmon || Mount Lemmon Survey ||  || align=right | 1.5 km || 
|-id=270 bgcolor=#d6d6d6
| 528270 ||  || — || June 14, 2007 || Kitt Peak || Spacewatch ||  || align=right | 2.7 km || 
|-id=271 bgcolor=#fefefe
| 528271 ||  || — || September 4, 2008 || Socorro || LINEAR ||  || align=right data-sort-value="0.66" | 660 m || 
|-id=272 bgcolor=#d6d6d6
| 528272 ||  || — || September 4, 2008 || Kitt Peak || Spacewatch ||  || align=right | 2.3 km || 
|-id=273 bgcolor=#d6d6d6
| 528273 ||  || — || September 4, 2008 || Kitt Peak || Spacewatch ||  || align=right | 2.1 km || 
|-id=274 bgcolor=#E9E9E9
| 528274 ||  || — || September 4, 2008 || Kitt Peak || Spacewatch ||  || align=right | 1.6 km || 
|-id=275 bgcolor=#d6d6d6
| 528275 ||  || — || September 3, 2008 || Kitt Peak || Spacewatch ||  || align=right | 2.0 km || 
|-id=276 bgcolor=#E9E9E9
| 528276 ||  || — || September 5, 2008 || Kitt Peak || Spacewatch ||  || align=right | 1.4 km || 
|-id=277 bgcolor=#d6d6d6
| 528277 ||  || — || September 5, 2008 || Kitt Peak || Spacewatch ||  || align=right | 2.7 km || 
|-id=278 bgcolor=#E9E9E9
| 528278 ||  || — || September 1, 2008 || Siding Spring || SSS ||  || align=right | 1.8 km || 
|-id=279 bgcolor=#E9E9E9
| 528279 ||  || — || September 9, 2008 || Mount Lemmon || Mount Lemmon Survey ||  || align=right | 1.1 km || 
|-id=280 bgcolor=#fefefe
| 528280 ||  || — || September 5, 2008 || Kitt Peak || Spacewatch ||  || align=right data-sort-value="0.63" | 630 m || 
|-id=281 bgcolor=#fefefe
| 528281 ||  || — || September 14, 1998 || Socorro || LINEAR ||  || align=right data-sort-value="0.81" | 810 m || 
|-id=282 bgcolor=#E9E9E9
| 528282 ||  || — || January 26, 2006 || Mount Lemmon || Mount Lemmon Survey ||  || align=right | 1.7 km || 
|-id=283 bgcolor=#d6d6d6
| 528283 ||  || — || September 5, 2008 || Kitt Peak || Spacewatch ||  || align=right | 2.1 km || 
|-id=284 bgcolor=#FFC2E0
| 528284 ||  || — || September 25, 2008 || Kitt Peak || Spacewatch || APO || align=right data-sort-value="0.21" | 210 m || 
|-id=285 bgcolor=#d6d6d6
| 528285 ||  || — || August 24, 2008 || Socorro || LINEAR ||  || align=right | 1.8 km || 
|-id=286 bgcolor=#E9E9E9
| 528286 ||  || — || September 19, 2008 || Kitt Peak || Spacewatch ||  || align=right data-sort-value="0.83" | 830 m || 
|-id=287 bgcolor=#E9E9E9
| 528287 ||  || — || August 24, 2008 || Kitt Peak || Spacewatch ||  || align=right | 1.8 km || 
|-id=288 bgcolor=#E9E9E9
| 528288 ||  || — || September 19, 2008 || Kitt Peak || Spacewatch || DOR || align=right | 1.9 km || 
|-id=289 bgcolor=#fefefe
| 528289 ||  || — || September 20, 2008 || Kitt Peak || Spacewatch ||  || align=right data-sort-value="0.69" | 690 m || 
|-id=290 bgcolor=#E9E9E9
| 528290 ||  || — || September 20, 2008 || Kitt Peak || Spacewatch ||  || align=right | 2.2 km || 
|-id=291 bgcolor=#fefefe
| 528291 ||  || — || September 9, 2008 || Mount Lemmon || Mount Lemmon Survey ||  || align=right data-sort-value="0.63" | 630 m || 
|-id=292 bgcolor=#E9E9E9
| 528292 ||  || — || September 20, 2008 || Kitt Peak || Spacewatch ||  || align=right | 2.0 km || 
|-id=293 bgcolor=#fefefe
| 528293 ||  || — || August 23, 2008 || Kitt Peak || Spacewatch ||  || align=right data-sort-value="0.57" | 570 m || 
|-id=294 bgcolor=#E9E9E9
| 528294 ||  || — || September 4, 2008 || Kitt Peak || Spacewatch ||  || align=right | 1.7 km || 
|-id=295 bgcolor=#fefefe
| 528295 ||  || — || September 20, 2008 || Mount Lemmon || Mount Lemmon Survey ||  || align=right data-sort-value="0.53" | 530 m || 
|-id=296 bgcolor=#E9E9E9
| 528296 ||  || — || September 20, 2008 || Mount Lemmon || Mount Lemmon Survey ||  || align=right | 1.3 km || 
|-id=297 bgcolor=#fefefe
| 528297 ||  || — || September 20, 2008 || Kitt Peak || Spacewatch ||  || align=right data-sort-value="0.55" | 550 m || 
|-id=298 bgcolor=#E9E9E9
| 528298 ||  || — || September 3, 2008 || Kitt Peak || Spacewatch ||  || align=right | 1.6 km || 
|-id=299 bgcolor=#d6d6d6
| 528299 ||  || — || September 22, 2008 || Catalina || CSS ||  || align=right | 2.8 km || 
|-id=300 bgcolor=#E9E9E9
| 528300 ||  || — || September 23, 2008 || Kitt Peak || Spacewatch ||  || align=right | 1.7 km || 
|}

528301–528400 

|-bgcolor=#E9E9E9
| 528301 ||  || — || August 24, 2008 || Kitt Peak || Spacewatch || AEO || align=right | 1.0 km || 
|-id=302 bgcolor=#d6d6d6
| 528302 ||  || — || August 24, 2008 || Kitt Peak || Spacewatch ||  || align=right | 2.0 km || 
|-id=303 bgcolor=#E9E9E9
| 528303 ||  || — || September 27, 2008 || Mount Lemmon || Mount Lemmon Survey ||  || align=right | 1.2 km || 
|-id=304 bgcolor=#E9E9E9
| 528304 ||  || — || September 4, 2008 || Kitt Peak || Spacewatch ||  || align=right data-sort-value="0.70" | 700 m || 
|-id=305 bgcolor=#E9E9E9
| 528305 ||  || — || September 21, 2008 || Kitt Peak || Spacewatch ||  || align=right | 2.0 km || 
|-id=306 bgcolor=#fefefe
| 528306 ||  || — || September 21, 2008 || Kitt Peak || Spacewatch ||  || align=right data-sort-value="0.67" | 670 m || 
|-id=307 bgcolor=#fefefe
| 528307 ||  || — || September 5, 2008 || La Sagra || OAM Obs. ||  || align=right data-sort-value="0.77" | 770 m || 
|-id=308 bgcolor=#fefefe
| 528308 ||  || — || September 21, 2008 || Kitt Peak || Spacewatch ||  || align=right data-sort-value="0.59" | 590 m || 
|-id=309 bgcolor=#E9E9E9
| 528309 ||  || — || September 9, 2008 || Kitt Peak || Spacewatch || DOR || align=right | 2.1 km || 
|-id=310 bgcolor=#d6d6d6
| 528310 ||  || — || September 22, 2008 || Kitt Peak || Spacewatch ||  || align=right | 1.8 km || 
|-id=311 bgcolor=#E9E9E9
| 528311 ||  || — || September 22, 2008 || Kitt Peak || Spacewatch ||  || align=right | 1.1 km || 
|-id=312 bgcolor=#E9E9E9
| 528312 ||  || — || September 22, 2008 || Mount Lemmon || Mount Lemmon Survey ||  || align=right | 1.4 km || 
|-id=313 bgcolor=#E9E9E9
| 528313 ||  || — || September 22, 2008 || Mount Lemmon || Mount Lemmon Survey ||  || align=right | 1.8 km || 
|-id=314 bgcolor=#d6d6d6
| 528314 ||  || — || September 22, 2008 || Mount Lemmon || Mount Lemmon Survey ||  || align=right | 1.5 km || 
|-id=315 bgcolor=#E9E9E9
| 528315 ||  || — || September 22, 2008 || Mount Lemmon || Mount Lemmon Survey ||  || align=right | 1.6 km || 
|-id=316 bgcolor=#fefefe
| 528316 ||  || — || September 6, 2008 || Mount Lemmon || Mount Lemmon Survey ||  || align=right data-sort-value="0.59" | 590 m || 
|-id=317 bgcolor=#d6d6d6
| 528317 ||  || — || September 22, 2008 || Mount Lemmon || Mount Lemmon Survey ||  || align=right | 1.9 km || 
|-id=318 bgcolor=#E9E9E9
| 528318 ||  || — || September 22, 2008 || Mount Lemmon || Mount Lemmon Survey ||  || align=right | 1.8 km || 
|-id=319 bgcolor=#E9E9E9
| 528319 ||  || — || September 22, 2008 || Kitt Peak || Spacewatch ||  || align=right | 1.6 km || 
|-id=320 bgcolor=#d6d6d6
| 528320 ||  || — || September 22, 2008 || Kitt Peak || Spacewatch ||  || align=right | 2.0 km || 
|-id=321 bgcolor=#E9E9E9
| 528321 ||  || — || September 22, 2008 || Kitt Peak || Spacewatch ||  || align=right | 1.4 km || 
|-id=322 bgcolor=#E9E9E9
| 528322 ||  || — || July 30, 2008 || Kitt Peak || Spacewatch ||  || align=right | 1.0 km || 
|-id=323 bgcolor=#E9E9E9
| 528323 ||  || — || September 23, 2008 || Kitt Peak || Spacewatch ||  || align=right | 1.8 km || 
|-id=324 bgcolor=#fefefe
| 528324 ||  || — || September 23, 2008 || Kitt Peak || Spacewatch ||  || align=right data-sort-value="0.62" | 620 m || 
|-id=325 bgcolor=#d6d6d6
| 528325 ||  || — || September 24, 2008 || Mount Lemmon || Mount Lemmon Survey ||  || align=right | 3.4 km || 
|-id=326 bgcolor=#E9E9E9
| 528326 ||  || — || September 24, 2008 || Kitt Peak || Spacewatch ||  || align=right | 1.6 km || 
|-id=327 bgcolor=#E9E9E9
| 528327 ||  || — || September 2, 2008 || Kitt Peak || Spacewatch ||  || align=right | 1.4 km || 
|-id=328 bgcolor=#E9E9E9
| 528328 ||  || — || November 28, 2013 || Kitt Peak || Spacewatch ||  || align=right | 1.5 km || 
|-id=329 bgcolor=#fefefe
| 528329 ||  || — || September 28, 2008 || Socorro || LINEAR ||  || align=right data-sort-value="0.64" | 640 m || 
|-id=330 bgcolor=#E9E9E9
| 528330 ||  || — || September 24, 2008 || Kitt Peak || Spacewatch ||  || align=right | 1.5 km || 
|-id=331 bgcolor=#d6d6d6
| 528331 ||  || — || September 24, 2008 || Mount Lemmon || Mount Lemmon Survey ||  || align=right | 2.0 km || 
|-id=332 bgcolor=#fefefe
| 528332 ||  || — || September 24, 2008 || Kitt Peak || Spacewatch ||  || align=right data-sort-value="0.67" | 670 m || 
|-id=333 bgcolor=#E9E9E9
| 528333 ||  || — || September 24, 2008 || Kitt Peak || Spacewatch ||  || align=right | 1.2 km || 
|-id=334 bgcolor=#fefefe
| 528334 ||  || — || September 20, 2008 || Kitt Peak || Spacewatch ||  || align=right data-sort-value="0.57" | 570 m || 
|-id=335 bgcolor=#E9E9E9
| 528335 ||  || — || September 24, 2008 || Kitt Peak || Spacewatch ||  || align=right | 1.9 km || 
|-id=336 bgcolor=#E9E9E9
| 528336 ||  || — || September 25, 2008 || Kitt Peak || Spacewatch ||  || align=right data-sort-value="0.63" | 630 m || 
|-id=337 bgcolor=#E9E9E9
| 528337 ||  || — || September 25, 2008 || Kitt Peak || Spacewatch ||  || align=right | 1.3 km || 
|-id=338 bgcolor=#d6d6d6
| 528338 ||  || — || September 25, 2008 || Kitt Peak || Spacewatch ||  || align=right | 2.4 km || 
|-id=339 bgcolor=#d6d6d6
| 528339 ||  || — || September 25, 2008 || Kitt Peak || Spacewatch ||  || align=right | 1.8 km || 
|-id=340 bgcolor=#E9E9E9
| 528340 ||  || — || September 25, 2008 || Kitt Peak || Spacewatch ||  || align=right | 1.6 km || 
|-id=341 bgcolor=#fefefe
| 528341 ||  || — || September 26, 2008 || Kitt Peak || Spacewatch ||  || align=right data-sort-value="0.65" | 650 m || 
|-id=342 bgcolor=#E9E9E9
| 528342 ||  || — || September 29, 2008 || Mount Lemmon || Mount Lemmon Survey ||  || align=right | 2.2 km || 
|-id=343 bgcolor=#E9E9E9
| 528343 ||  || — || September 20, 2008 || Catalina || CSS || EUN || align=right | 1.1 km || 
|-id=344 bgcolor=#E9E9E9
| 528344 ||  || — || September 30, 2008 || La Sagra || OAM Obs. ||  || align=right data-sort-value="0.90" | 900 m || 
|-id=345 bgcolor=#E9E9E9
| 528345 ||  || — || September 2, 2008 || Kitt Peak || Spacewatch ||  || align=right | 1.3 km || 
|-id=346 bgcolor=#E9E9E9
| 528346 ||  || — || September 25, 2008 || Kitt Peak || Spacewatch ||  || align=right | 1.1 km || 
|-id=347 bgcolor=#E9E9E9
| 528347 ||  || — || September 3, 2008 || Kitt Peak || Spacewatch ||  || align=right | 1.3 km || 
|-id=348 bgcolor=#d6d6d6
| 528348 ||  || — || September 5, 2008 || Kitt Peak || Spacewatch ||  || align=right | 2.0 km || 
|-id=349 bgcolor=#E9E9E9
| 528349 ||  || — || September 5, 2008 || Kitt Peak || Spacewatch || WIT || align=right data-sort-value="0.88" | 880 m || 
|-id=350 bgcolor=#E9E9E9
| 528350 ||  || — || August 24, 2008 || Kitt Peak || Spacewatch ||  || align=right | 2.0 km || 
|-id=351 bgcolor=#FA8072
| 528351 ||  || — || September 28, 2008 || Mount Lemmon || Mount Lemmon Survey ||  || align=right data-sort-value="0.61" | 610 m || 
|-id=352 bgcolor=#d6d6d6
| 528352 ||  || — || September 25, 2008 || Kitt Peak || Spacewatch ||  || align=right | 2.4 km || 
|-id=353 bgcolor=#fefefe
| 528353 ||  || — || September 29, 2008 || Mount Lemmon || Mount Lemmon Survey ||  || align=right data-sort-value="0.40" | 400 m || 
|-id=354 bgcolor=#E9E9E9
| 528354 ||  || — || September 6, 2008 || Mount Lemmon || Mount Lemmon Survey || DOR || align=right | 2.5 km || 
|-id=355 bgcolor=#E9E9E9
| 528355 ||  || — || September 29, 2008 || Kitt Peak || Spacewatch ||  || align=right | 1.2 km || 
|-id=356 bgcolor=#E9E9E9
| 528356 ||  || — || September 27, 2008 || Mount Lemmon || Mount Lemmon Survey ||  || align=right | 2.1 km || 
|-id=357 bgcolor=#E9E9E9
| 528357 ||  || — || September 20, 2008 || Kitt Peak || Spacewatch ||  || align=right | 1.6 km || 
|-id=358 bgcolor=#E9E9E9
| 528358 ||  || — || September 21, 2008 || Kitt Peak || Spacewatch || AGN || align=right | 1.1 km || 
|-id=359 bgcolor=#fefefe
| 528359 ||  || — || September 21, 2008 || Kitt Peak || Spacewatch ||  || align=right data-sort-value="0.58" | 580 m || 
|-id=360 bgcolor=#fefefe
| 528360 ||  || — || September 24, 2008 || Kitt Peak || Spacewatch ||  || align=right data-sort-value="0.57" | 570 m || 
|-id=361 bgcolor=#E9E9E9
| 528361 ||  || — || September 26, 2008 || Kitt Peak || Spacewatch ||  || align=right | 1.3 km || 
|-id=362 bgcolor=#d6d6d6
| 528362 ||  || — || September 23, 2008 || Mount Lemmon || Mount Lemmon Survey ||  || align=right | 1.9 km || 
|-id=363 bgcolor=#E9E9E9
| 528363 ||  || — || September 19, 2008 || Kitt Peak || Spacewatch ||  || align=right | 1.5 km || 
|-id=364 bgcolor=#E9E9E9
| 528364 ||  || — || September 23, 2008 || Catalina || CSS ||  || align=right | 2.2 km || 
|-id=365 bgcolor=#d6d6d6
| 528365 ||  || — || September 23, 2008 || Mount Lemmon || Mount Lemmon Survey || KOR || align=right data-sort-value="0.94" | 940 m || 
|-id=366 bgcolor=#d6d6d6
| 528366 ||  || — || September 24, 2008 || Kitt Peak || Spacewatch || KOR || align=right | 1.0 km || 
|-id=367 bgcolor=#E9E9E9
| 528367 ||  || — || September 24, 2008 || Mount Lemmon || Mount Lemmon Survey ||  || align=right | 2.2 km || 
|-id=368 bgcolor=#d6d6d6
| 528368 ||  || — || September 30, 2008 || Catalina || CSS ||  || align=right | 2.0 km || 
|-id=369 bgcolor=#E9E9E9
| 528369 ||  || — || September 24, 2008 || Kitt Peak || Spacewatch ||  || align=right | 1.9 km || 
|-id=370 bgcolor=#d6d6d6
| 528370 ||  || — || September 25, 2008 || Mount Lemmon || Mount Lemmon Survey ||  || align=right | 2.2 km || 
|-id=371 bgcolor=#d6d6d6
| 528371 ||  || — || September 20, 2008 || Mount Lemmon || Mount Lemmon Survey ||  || align=right | 1.7 km || 
|-id=372 bgcolor=#E9E9E9
| 528372 ||  || — || September 28, 2008 || Mount Lemmon || Mount Lemmon Survey ||  || align=right | 1.5 km || 
|-id=373 bgcolor=#E9E9E9
| 528373 ||  || — || September 23, 2008 || Mount Lemmon || Mount Lemmon Survey ||  || align=right | 1.5 km || 
|-id=374 bgcolor=#E9E9E9
| 528374 ||  || — || September 26, 2008 || Kitt Peak || Spacewatch || AGN || align=right data-sort-value="0.89" | 890 m || 
|-id=375 bgcolor=#d6d6d6
| 528375 ||  || — || September 2, 2008 || Kitt Peak || Spacewatch || KOR || align=right | 1.1 km || 
|-id=376 bgcolor=#d6d6d6
| 528376 ||  || — || September 23, 2008 || Mount Lemmon || Mount Lemmon Survey ||  || align=right | 1.9 km || 
|-id=377 bgcolor=#E9E9E9
| 528377 ||  || — || September 23, 2008 || Kitt Peak || Spacewatch ||  || align=right | 1.6 km || 
|-id=378 bgcolor=#fefefe
| 528378 ||  || — || September 27, 2008 || Mount Lemmon || Mount Lemmon Survey ||  || align=right data-sort-value="0.64" | 640 m || 
|-id=379 bgcolor=#E9E9E9
| 528379 ||  || — || September 23, 2008 || Kitt Peak || Spacewatch ||  || align=right | 1.7 km || 
|-id=380 bgcolor=#fefefe
| 528380 ||  || — || September 29, 2008 || Catalina || CSS ||  || align=right data-sort-value="0.68" | 680 m || 
|-id=381 bgcolor=#C2E0FF
| 528381 ||  || — || September 24, 2008 || Palomar || M. E. Schwamb, M. E. Brown, D. L. Rabinowitz || res1:6 || align=right | 606 km || 
|-id=382 bgcolor=#E9E9E9
| 528382 ||  || — || September 22, 2008 || Catalina || CSS ||  || align=right | 1.4 km || 
|-id=383 bgcolor=#E9E9E9
| 528383 ||  || — || September 23, 2008 || Catalina || CSS || (194) || align=right data-sort-value="0.96" | 960 m || 
|-id=384 bgcolor=#E9E9E9
| 528384 ||  || — || September 26, 2008 || Kitt Peak || Spacewatch ||  || align=right | 2.0 km || 
|-id=385 bgcolor=#E9E9E9
| 528385 ||  || — || September 22, 2008 || Socorro || LINEAR ||  || align=right | 2.6 km || 
|-id=386 bgcolor=#E9E9E9
| 528386 ||  || — || September 22, 2008 || Kitt Peak || Spacewatch ||  || align=right | 2.0 km || 
|-id=387 bgcolor=#E9E9E9
| 528387 ||  || — || September 24, 2008 || Kitt Peak || Spacewatch ||  || align=right | 1.2 km || 
|-id=388 bgcolor=#E9E9E9
| 528388 ||  || — || September 28, 2008 || Mount Lemmon || Mount Lemmon Survey ||  || align=right | 1.6 km || 
|-id=389 bgcolor=#fefefe
| 528389 ||  || — || September 29, 2008 || Catalina || CSS ||  || align=right data-sort-value="0.74" | 740 m || 
|-id=390 bgcolor=#E9E9E9
| 528390 ||  || — || September 29, 2008 || Kitt Peak || Spacewatch ||  || align=right | 2.4 km || 
|-id=391 bgcolor=#E9E9E9
| 528391 ||  || — || September 30, 2008 || Catalina || CSS || BAR || align=right | 1.3 km || 
|-id=392 bgcolor=#E9E9E9
| 528392 ||  || — || September 23, 2008 || Mount Lemmon || Mount Lemmon Survey ||  || align=right | 1.3 km || 
|-id=393 bgcolor=#E9E9E9
| 528393 ||  || — || October 5, 2013 || Haleakala || Pan-STARRS ||  || align=right | 2.0 km || 
|-id=394 bgcolor=#E9E9E9
| 528394 ||  || — || September 23, 2008 || Kitt Peak || Spacewatch ||  || align=right | 1.4 km || 
|-id=395 bgcolor=#fefefe
| 528395 ||  || — || October 25, 2005 || Mount Lemmon || Mount Lemmon Survey ||  || align=right data-sort-value="0.57" | 570 m || 
|-id=396 bgcolor=#fefefe
| 528396 ||  || — || September 23, 2008 || Mount Lemmon || Mount Lemmon Survey ||  || align=right data-sort-value="0.43" | 430 m || 
|-id=397 bgcolor=#E9E9E9
| 528397 ||  || — || September 24, 2008 || Mount Lemmon || Mount Lemmon Survey ||  || align=right | 1.6 km || 
|-id=398 bgcolor=#E9E9E9
| 528398 ||  || — || September 2, 2008 || Kitt Peak || Spacewatch ||  || align=right | 1.6 km || 
|-id=399 bgcolor=#E9E9E9
| 528399 ||  || — || September 21, 2008 || Kitt Peak || Spacewatch ||  || align=right | 1.7 km || 
|-id=400 bgcolor=#E9E9E9
| 528400 ||  || — || October 1, 2008 || Mount Lemmon || Mount Lemmon Survey ||  || align=right | 1.3 km || 
|}

528401–528500 

|-bgcolor=#E9E9E9
| 528401 ||  || — || September 24, 2008 || Kitt Peak || Spacewatch ||  || align=right | 1.7 km || 
|-id=402 bgcolor=#E9E9E9
| 528402 ||  || — || October 1, 2008 || Kitt Peak || Spacewatch ||  || align=right | 1.9 km || 
|-id=403 bgcolor=#E9E9E9
| 528403 ||  || — || December 13, 2004 || Kitt Peak || Spacewatch ||  || align=right | 1.8 km || 
|-id=404 bgcolor=#E9E9E9
| 528404 ||  || — || September 24, 2008 || Kitt Peak || Spacewatch ||  || align=right data-sort-value="0.70" | 700 m || 
|-id=405 bgcolor=#E9E9E9
| 528405 ||  || — || December 19, 2004 || Mount Lemmon || Mount Lemmon Survey ||  || align=right | 1.7 km || 
|-id=406 bgcolor=#E9E9E9
| 528406 ||  || — || September 6, 2008 || Mount Lemmon || Mount Lemmon Survey ||  || align=right | 1.7 km || 
|-id=407 bgcolor=#E9E9E9
| 528407 ||  || — || September 20, 2008 || Kitt Peak || Spacewatch ||  || align=right | 2.0 km || 
|-id=408 bgcolor=#E9E9E9
| 528408 ||  || — || October 2, 2008 || Kitt Peak || Spacewatch ||  || align=right data-sort-value="0.85" | 850 m || 
|-id=409 bgcolor=#d6d6d6
| 528409 ||  || — || September 26, 2008 || Kitt Peak || Spacewatch || TRE || align=right | 1.9 km || 
|-id=410 bgcolor=#fefefe
| 528410 ||  || — || September 9, 2008 || Kitt Peak || Spacewatch ||  || align=right data-sort-value="0.65" | 650 m || 
|-id=411 bgcolor=#E9E9E9
| 528411 ||  || — || September 24, 2008 || Kitt Peak || Spacewatch ||  || align=right | 1.6 km || 
|-id=412 bgcolor=#fefefe
| 528412 ||  || — || September 23, 2008 || Kitt Peak || Spacewatch ||  || align=right data-sort-value="0.56" | 560 m || 
|-id=413 bgcolor=#fefefe
| 528413 ||  || — || September 23, 2008 || Kitt Peak || Spacewatch ||  || align=right data-sort-value="0.59" | 590 m || 
|-id=414 bgcolor=#fefefe
| 528414 ||  || — || September 23, 2008 || Kitt Peak || Spacewatch ||  || align=right data-sort-value="0.49" | 490 m || 
|-id=415 bgcolor=#fefefe
| 528415 ||  || — || October 2, 2008 || Kitt Peak || Spacewatch ||  || align=right data-sort-value="0.65" | 650 m || 
|-id=416 bgcolor=#d6d6d6
| 528416 ||  || — || September 22, 2008 || Mount Lemmon || Mount Lemmon Survey ||  || align=right | 2.8 km || 
|-id=417 bgcolor=#fefefe
| 528417 ||  || — || October 2, 2008 || Mount Lemmon || Mount Lemmon Survey ||  || align=right data-sort-value="0.36" | 360 m || 
|-id=418 bgcolor=#E9E9E9
| 528418 ||  || — || October 2, 2008 || Kitt Peak || Spacewatch ||  || align=right | 1.8 km || 
|-id=419 bgcolor=#d6d6d6
| 528419 ||  || — || September 20, 2008 || Mount Lemmon || Mount Lemmon Survey || KOR || align=right | 1.0 km || 
|-id=420 bgcolor=#fefefe
| 528420 ||  || — || October 3, 2008 || Kitt Peak || Spacewatch ||  || align=right data-sort-value="0.50" | 500 m || 
|-id=421 bgcolor=#fefefe
| 528421 ||  || — || September 20, 2008 || Kitt Peak || Spacewatch ||  || align=right data-sort-value="0.75" | 750 m || 
|-id=422 bgcolor=#E9E9E9
| 528422 ||  || — || October 1, 2008 || La Sagra || OAM Obs. ||  || align=right | 1.8 km || 
|-id=423 bgcolor=#d6d6d6
| 528423 ||  || — || September 25, 2008 || Kitt Peak || Spacewatch ||  || align=right | 1.3 km || 
|-id=424 bgcolor=#E9E9E9
| 528424 ||  || — || September 23, 2008 || Catalina || CSS ||  || align=right | 2.7 km || 
|-id=425 bgcolor=#E9E9E9
| 528425 ||  || — || October 5, 2008 || La Sagra || OAM Obs. ||  || align=right | 1.9 km || 
|-id=426 bgcolor=#fefefe
| 528426 ||  || — || October 6, 2008 || Kitt Peak || Spacewatch ||  || align=right data-sort-value="0.59" | 590 m || 
|-id=427 bgcolor=#d6d6d6
| 528427 ||  || — || October 6, 2008 || Kitt Peak || Spacewatch ||  || align=right | 2.3 km || 
|-id=428 bgcolor=#d6d6d6
| 528428 ||  || — || October 6, 2008 || Kitt Peak || Spacewatch ||  || align=right | 1.8 km || 
|-id=429 bgcolor=#E9E9E9
| 528429 ||  || — || September 7, 2008 || Mount Lemmon || Mount Lemmon Survey ||  || align=right | 1.2 km || 
|-id=430 bgcolor=#d6d6d6
| 528430 ||  || — || October 6, 2008 || Kitt Peak || Spacewatch ||  || align=right | 2.2 km || 
|-id=431 bgcolor=#d6d6d6
| 528431 ||  || — || September 23, 2008 || Mount Lemmon || Mount Lemmon Survey || KOR || align=right | 1.2 km || 
|-id=432 bgcolor=#d6d6d6
| 528432 ||  || — || October 6, 2008 || Mount Lemmon || Mount Lemmon Survey ||  || align=right | 2.0 km || 
|-id=433 bgcolor=#E9E9E9
| 528433 ||  || — || October 6, 2008 || Mount Lemmon || Mount Lemmon Survey ||  || align=right | 1.4 km || 
|-id=434 bgcolor=#fefefe
| 528434 ||  || — || December 2, 2005 || Mount Lemmon || Mount Lemmon Survey ||  || align=right data-sort-value="0.83" | 830 m || 
|-id=435 bgcolor=#fefefe
| 528435 ||  || — || September 23, 2008 || Catalina || CSS ||  || align=right data-sort-value="0.57" | 570 m || 
|-id=436 bgcolor=#FA8072
| 528436 ||  || — || September 5, 2008 || Socorro || LINEAR ||  || align=right data-sort-value="0.61" | 610 m || 
|-id=437 bgcolor=#E9E9E9
| 528437 ||  || — || October 6, 2008 || Catalina || CSS ||  || align=right | 1.5 km || 
|-id=438 bgcolor=#fefefe
| 528438 ||  || — || September 23, 2008 || Kitt Peak || Spacewatch ||  || align=right data-sort-value="0.57" | 570 m || 
|-id=439 bgcolor=#d6d6d6
| 528439 ||  || — || September 23, 2008 || Kitt Peak || Spacewatch ||  || align=right | 1.6 km || 
|-id=440 bgcolor=#E9E9E9
| 528440 ||  || — || September 24, 2008 || Mount Lemmon || Mount Lemmon Survey ||  || align=right data-sort-value="0.83" | 830 m || 
|-id=441 bgcolor=#E9E9E9
| 528441 ||  || — || October 8, 2008 || Mount Lemmon || Mount Lemmon Survey ||  || align=right | 1.8 km || 
|-id=442 bgcolor=#E9E9E9
| 528442 ||  || — || September 23, 2008 || Kitt Peak || Spacewatch ||  || align=right | 1.9 km || 
|-id=443 bgcolor=#E9E9E9
| 528443 ||  || — || September 23, 2008 || Kitt Peak || Spacewatch ||  || align=right | 1.9 km || 
|-id=444 bgcolor=#E9E9E9
| 528444 ||  || — || October 1, 2008 || Mount Lemmon || Mount Lemmon Survey ||  || align=right data-sort-value="0.85" | 850 m || 
|-id=445 bgcolor=#E9E9E9
| 528445 ||  || — || October 1, 2008 || Kitt Peak || Spacewatch ||  || align=right | 1.8 km || 
|-id=446 bgcolor=#d6d6d6
| 528446 ||  || — || October 8, 2008 || Kitt Peak || Spacewatch ||  || align=right | 2.2 km || 
|-id=447 bgcolor=#d6d6d6
| 528447 ||  || — || September 2, 2008 || Kitt Peak || Spacewatch ||  || align=right | 1.9 km || 
|-id=448 bgcolor=#d6d6d6
| 528448 ||  || — || October 9, 2008 || Mount Lemmon || Mount Lemmon Survey ||  || align=right | 1.9 km || 
|-id=449 bgcolor=#E9E9E9
| 528449 ||  || — || October 9, 2008 || Mount Lemmon || Mount Lemmon Survey ||  || align=right data-sort-value="0.93" | 930 m || 
|-id=450 bgcolor=#E9E9E9
| 528450 ||  || — || September 3, 2008 || Kitt Peak || Spacewatch ||  || align=right | 1.9 km || 
|-id=451 bgcolor=#E9E9E9
| 528451 ||  || — || September 25, 2008 || Mount Lemmon || Mount Lemmon Survey ||  || align=right | 1.9 km || 
|-id=452 bgcolor=#E9E9E9
| 528452 ||  || — || October 2, 2008 || Kitt Peak || Spacewatch ||  || align=right | 1.3 km || 
|-id=453 bgcolor=#E9E9E9
| 528453 ||  || — || October 1, 2008 || Kitt Peak || Spacewatch ||  || align=right | 1.1 km || 
|-id=454 bgcolor=#E9E9E9
| 528454 ||  || — || October 1, 2008 || Kitt Peak || Spacewatch ||  || align=right | 1.7 km || 
|-id=455 bgcolor=#fefefe
| 528455 ||  || — || October 1, 2008 || Mount Lemmon || Mount Lemmon Survey ||  || align=right data-sort-value="0.57" | 570 m || 
|-id=456 bgcolor=#E9E9E9
| 528456 ||  || — || October 8, 2008 || Mount Lemmon || Mount Lemmon Survey ||  || align=right | 1.8 km || 
|-id=457 bgcolor=#fefefe
| 528457 ||  || — || October 9, 2008 || Mount Lemmon || Mount Lemmon Survey ||  || align=right data-sort-value="0.71" | 710 m || 
|-id=458 bgcolor=#E9E9E9
| 528458 ||  || — || October 9, 2008 || Kitt Peak || Spacewatch || AGN || align=right data-sort-value="0.85" | 850 m || 
|-id=459 bgcolor=#d6d6d6
| 528459 ||  || — || October 6, 2008 || Kitt Peak || Spacewatch ||  || align=right | 2.8 km || 
|-id=460 bgcolor=#E9E9E9
| 528460 ||  || — || October 2, 2008 || Kitt Peak || Spacewatch ||  || align=right | 1.1 km || 
|-id=461 bgcolor=#E9E9E9
| 528461 ||  || — || October 2, 2008 || Kitt Peak || Spacewatch ||  || align=right | 1.5 km || 
|-id=462 bgcolor=#E9E9E9
| 528462 ||  || — || October 1, 2008 || Catalina || CSS || DOR || align=right | 2.6 km || 
|-id=463 bgcolor=#fefefe
| 528463 ||  || — || October 3, 2008 || Socorro || LINEAR ||  || align=right data-sort-value="0.65" | 650 m || 
|-id=464 bgcolor=#d6d6d6
| 528464 ||  || — || October 1, 2008 || Mount Lemmon || Mount Lemmon Survey || BRA || align=right | 1.3 km || 
|-id=465 bgcolor=#E9E9E9
| 528465 ||  || — || October 8, 2008 || Kitt Peak || Spacewatch ||  || align=right | 1.5 km || 
|-id=466 bgcolor=#fefefe
| 528466 ||  || — || October 3, 2008 || Mount Lemmon || Mount Lemmon Survey ||  || align=right data-sort-value="0.71" | 710 m || 
|-id=467 bgcolor=#E9E9E9
| 528467 ||  || — || October 10, 2008 || Socorro || LINEAR ||  || align=right | 1.7 km || 
|-id=468 bgcolor=#d6d6d6
| 528468 ||  || — || January 4, 2010 || Kitt Peak || Spacewatch || 3:2 || align=right | 3.5 km || 
|-id=469 bgcolor=#E9E9E9
| 528469 ||  || — || October 10, 2008 || Mount Lemmon || Mount Lemmon Survey ||  || align=right | 2.2 km || 
|-id=470 bgcolor=#E9E9E9
| 528470 ||  || — || October 7, 2008 || Mount Lemmon || Mount Lemmon Survey ||  || align=right | 1.1 km || 
|-id=471 bgcolor=#E9E9E9
| 528471 ||  || — || October 9, 2008 || Mount Lemmon || Mount Lemmon Survey ||  || align=right | 1.3 km || 
|-id=472 bgcolor=#E9E9E9
| 528472 ||  || — || October 10, 2008 || Mount Lemmon || Mount Lemmon Survey ||  || align=right | 2.7 km || 
|-id=473 bgcolor=#fefefe
| 528473 ||  || — || October 6, 2008 || Mount Lemmon || Mount Lemmon Survey ||  || align=right data-sort-value="0.52" | 520 m || 
|-id=474 bgcolor=#E9E9E9
| 528474 ||  || — || September 22, 2008 || Catalina || CSS ||  || align=right | 2.4 km || 
|-id=475 bgcolor=#E9E9E9
| 528475 ||  || — || October 1, 2008 || Catalina || CSS || BAR || align=right | 1.1 km || 
|-id=476 bgcolor=#FA8072
| 528476 ||  || — || September 29, 2008 || Catalina || CSS ||  || align=right data-sort-value="0.58" | 580 m || 
|-id=477 bgcolor=#E9E9E9
| 528477 ||  || — || September 4, 2008 || Kitt Peak || Spacewatch ||  || align=right | 1.6 km || 
|-id=478 bgcolor=#d6d6d6
| 528478 ||  || — || September 4, 2008 || Kitt Peak || Spacewatch ||  || align=right | 1.9 km || 
|-id=479 bgcolor=#E9E9E9
| 528479 ||  || — || October 2, 2008 || Kitt Peak || Spacewatch ||  || align=right data-sort-value="0.82" | 820 m || 
|-id=480 bgcolor=#d6d6d6
| 528480 ||  || — || October 20, 2008 || Kitt Peak || Spacewatch || KOR || align=right | 1.2 km || 
|-id=481 bgcolor=#fefefe
| 528481 ||  || — || October 20, 2008 || Kitt Peak || Spacewatch ||  || align=right data-sort-value="0.62" | 620 m || 
|-id=482 bgcolor=#E9E9E9
| 528482 ||  || — || October 6, 2008 || Mount Lemmon || Mount Lemmon Survey ||  || align=right | 1.8 km || 
|-id=483 bgcolor=#fefefe
| 528483 ||  || — || September 22, 2008 || Mount Lemmon || Mount Lemmon Survey ||  || align=right data-sort-value="0.57" | 570 m || 
|-id=484 bgcolor=#E9E9E9
| 528484 ||  || — || October 20, 2008 || Kitt Peak || Spacewatch ||  || align=right | 1.3 km || 
|-id=485 bgcolor=#E9E9E9
| 528485 ||  || — || September 25, 2008 || Kitt Peak || Spacewatch ||  || align=right | 1.1 km || 
|-id=486 bgcolor=#E9E9E9
| 528486 ||  || — || October 8, 2008 || Kitt Peak || Spacewatch ||  || align=right | 1.7 km || 
|-id=487 bgcolor=#E9E9E9
| 528487 ||  || — || October 20, 2008 || Kitt Peak || Spacewatch ||  || align=right | 1.7 km || 
|-id=488 bgcolor=#d6d6d6
| 528488 ||  || — || October 20, 2008 || Mount Lemmon || Mount Lemmon Survey ||  || align=right | 2.2 km || 
|-id=489 bgcolor=#fefefe
| 528489 Ntuef ||  ||  || October 20, 2008 || Lulin || X. Y. Hsiao, Q.-z. Ye ||  || align=right data-sort-value="0.61" | 610 m || 
|-id=490 bgcolor=#d6d6d6
| 528490 ||  || — || October 3, 2008 || Kitt Peak || Spacewatch ||  || align=right | 1.9 km || 
|-id=491 bgcolor=#E9E9E9
| 528491 ||  || — || October 1, 2008 || Mount Lemmon || Mount Lemmon Survey ||  || align=right | 2.0 km || 
|-id=492 bgcolor=#fefefe
| 528492 ||  || — || September 28, 2008 || Mount Lemmon || Mount Lemmon Survey ||  || align=right data-sort-value="0.66" | 660 m || 
|-id=493 bgcolor=#fefefe
| 528493 ||  || — || October 9, 2008 || Kitt Peak || Spacewatch ||  || align=right data-sort-value="0.59" | 590 m || 
|-id=494 bgcolor=#E9E9E9
| 528494 ||  || — || October 6, 2008 || Mount Lemmon || Mount Lemmon Survey ||  || align=right | 1.7 km || 
|-id=495 bgcolor=#fefefe
| 528495 ||  || — || September 6, 2008 || Mount Lemmon || Mount Lemmon Survey ||  || align=right data-sort-value="0.52" | 520 m || 
|-id=496 bgcolor=#d6d6d6
| 528496 ||  || — || October 21, 2008 || Mount Lemmon || Mount Lemmon Survey ||  || align=right | 3.3 km || 
|-id=497 bgcolor=#FA8072
| 528497 ||  || — || October 21, 2008 || Kitt Peak || Spacewatch ||  || align=right | 1.1 km || 
|-id=498 bgcolor=#E9E9E9
| 528498 ||  || — || October 21, 2008 || Mount Lemmon || Mount Lemmon Survey ||  || align=right | 2.1 km || 
|-id=499 bgcolor=#d6d6d6
| 528499 ||  || — || October 21, 2008 || Kitt Peak || Spacewatch ||  || align=right | 2.0 km || 
|-id=500 bgcolor=#E9E9E9
| 528500 ||  || — || October 1, 2008 || Kitt Peak || Spacewatch ||  || align=right | 1.4 km || 
|}

528501–528600 

|-bgcolor=#E9E9E9
| 528501 ||  || — || October 9, 2008 || Kitt Peak || Spacewatch ||  || align=right | 1.4 km || 
|-id=502 bgcolor=#fefefe
| 528502 ||  || — || September 22, 2008 || Kitt Peak || Spacewatch ||  || align=right data-sort-value="0.50" | 500 m || 
|-id=503 bgcolor=#E9E9E9
| 528503 ||  || — || October 8, 2008 || Kitt Peak || Spacewatch ||  || align=right | 2.2 km || 
|-id=504 bgcolor=#E9E9E9
| 528504 ||  || — || September 29, 2008 || Kitt Peak || Spacewatch ||  || align=right data-sort-value="0.96" | 960 m || 
|-id=505 bgcolor=#d6d6d6
| 528505 ||  || — || October 1, 2008 || Mount Lemmon || Mount Lemmon Survey || KOR || align=right | 1.1 km || 
|-id=506 bgcolor=#fefefe
| 528506 ||  || — || October 7, 2008 || Mount Lemmon || Mount Lemmon Survey ||  || align=right data-sort-value="0.65" | 650 m || 
|-id=507 bgcolor=#FFC2E0
| 528507 ||  || — || October 29, 2008 || Socorro || LINEAR || AMO || align=right data-sort-value="0.68" | 680 m || 
|-id=508 bgcolor=#fefefe
| 528508 ||  || — || September 23, 2008 || Kitt Peak || Spacewatch ||  || align=right data-sort-value="0.39" | 390 m || 
|-id=509 bgcolor=#fefefe
| 528509 ||  || — || October 21, 2008 || Kitt Peak || Spacewatch ||  || align=right data-sort-value="0.61" | 610 m || 
|-id=510 bgcolor=#d6d6d6
| 528510 ||  || — || October 22, 2008 || Kitt Peak || Spacewatch ||  || align=right | 2.6 km || 
|-id=511 bgcolor=#E9E9E9
| 528511 ||  || — || October 22, 2008 || Kitt Peak || Spacewatch ||  || align=right | 1.5 km || 
|-id=512 bgcolor=#d6d6d6
| 528512 ||  || — || September 29, 2008 || Mount Lemmon || Mount Lemmon Survey ||  || align=right | 2.5 km || 
|-id=513 bgcolor=#d6d6d6
| 528513 ||  || — || October 22, 2008 || Kitt Peak || Spacewatch ||  || align=right | 2.0 km || 
|-id=514 bgcolor=#fefefe
| 528514 ||  || — || September 30, 2008 || Mount Lemmon || Mount Lemmon Survey ||  || align=right data-sort-value="0.59" | 590 m || 
|-id=515 bgcolor=#d6d6d6
| 528515 ||  || — || October 22, 2008 || Kitt Peak || Spacewatch ||  || align=right | 2.1 km || 
|-id=516 bgcolor=#d6d6d6
| 528516 ||  || — || September 30, 2008 || Mount Lemmon || Mount Lemmon Survey ||  || align=right | 2.7 km || 
|-id=517 bgcolor=#E9E9E9
| 528517 ||  || — || October 22, 2008 || Kitt Peak || Spacewatch ||  || align=right | 1.9 km || 
|-id=518 bgcolor=#E9E9E9
| 528518 ||  || — || October 22, 2008 || Kitt Peak || Spacewatch ||  || align=right data-sort-value="0.73" | 730 m || 
|-id=519 bgcolor=#E9E9E9
| 528519 ||  || — || October 22, 2008 || Kitt Peak || Spacewatch ||  || align=right | 2.4 km || 
|-id=520 bgcolor=#d6d6d6
| 528520 ||  || — || October 22, 2008 || Kitt Peak || Spacewatch ||  || align=right | 2.0 km || 
|-id=521 bgcolor=#E9E9E9
| 528521 ||  || — || October 22, 2008 || Kitt Peak || Spacewatch ||  || align=right | 2.0 km || 
|-id=522 bgcolor=#d6d6d6
| 528522 ||  || — || October 22, 2008 || Kitt Peak || Spacewatch ||  || align=right | 2.2 km || 
|-id=523 bgcolor=#d6d6d6
| 528523 ||  || — || October 22, 2008 || Kitt Peak || Spacewatch ||  || align=right | 2.8 km || 
|-id=524 bgcolor=#d6d6d6
| 528524 ||  || — || October 22, 2008 || Kitt Peak || Spacewatch ||  || align=right | 2.1 km || 
|-id=525 bgcolor=#d6d6d6
| 528525 ||  || — || October 22, 2008 || Kitt Peak || Spacewatch ||  || align=right | 2.2 km || 
|-id=526 bgcolor=#d6d6d6
| 528526 ||  || — || October 23, 2008 || Kitt Peak || Spacewatch || SHU3:2 || align=right | 5.1 km || 
|-id=527 bgcolor=#E9E9E9
| 528527 ||  || — || October 23, 2008 || Kitt Peak || Spacewatch ||  || align=right | 1.5 km || 
|-id=528 bgcolor=#d6d6d6
| 528528 ||  || — || October 23, 2008 || Kitt Peak || Spacewatch ||  || align=right | 2.1 km || 
|-id=529 bgcolor=#fefefe
| 528529 ||  || — || September 23, 2008 || Mount Lemmon || Mount Lemmon Survey ||  || align=right data-sort-value="0.56" | 560 m || 
|-id=530 bgcolor=#d6d6d6
| 528530 ||  || — || October 23, 2008 || Kitt Peak || Spacewatch ||  || align=right | 1.7 km || 
|-id=531 bgcolor=#fefefe
| 528531 ||  || — || October 23, 2008 || Kitt Peak || Spacewatch ||  || align=right data-sort-value="0.64" | 640 m || 
|-id=532 bgcolor=#d6d6d6
| 528532 ||  || — || October 4, 2008 || Mount Lemmon || Mount Lemmon Survey ||  || align=right | 2.7 km || 
|-id=533 bgcolor=#fefefe
| 528533 ||  || — || September 28, 2008 || Mount Lemmon || Mount Lemmon Survey ||  || align=right data-sort-value="0.70" | 700 m || 
|-id=534 bgcolor=#E9E9E9
| 528534 ||  || — || September 22, 2008 || Kitt Peak || Spacewatch ||  || align=right | 1.8 km || 
|-id=535 bgcolor=#E9E9E9
| 528535 ||  || — || October 24, 2008 || Kitt Peak || Spacewatch ||  || align=right | 1.7 km || 
|-id=536 bgcolor=#d6d6d6
| 528536 ||  || — || October 24, 2008 || Kitt Peak || Spacewatch || EOS || align=right | 1.7 km || 
|-id=537 bgcolor=#E9E9E9
| 528537 ||  || — || October 24, 2008 || Mount Lemmon || Mount Lemmon Survey ||  || align=right | 1.8 km || 
|-id=538 bgcolor=#fefefe
| 528538 ||  || — || October 24, 2008 || Kitt Peak || Spacewatch ||  || align=right data-sort-value="0.59" | 590 m || 
|-id=539 bgcolor=#E9E9E9
| 528539 ||  || — || October 20, 2008 || Kitt Peak || Spacewatch ||  || align=right | 1.4 km || 
|-id=540 bgcolor=#E9E9E9
| 528540 ||  || — || September 23, 2008 || Kitt Peak || Spacewatch ||  || align=right | 1.3 km || 
|-id=541 bgcolor=#d6d6d6
| 528541 ||  || — || September 22, 2008 || Mount Lemmon || Mount Lemmon Survey ||  || align=right | 2.8 km || 
|-id=542 bgcolor=#d6d6d6
| 528542 ||  || — || October 24, 2008 || Kitt Peak || Spacewatch || EOS || align=right | 1.9 km || 
|-id=543 bgcolor=#d6d6d6
| 528543 ||  || — || March 10, 2005 || Mount Lemmon || Mount Lemmon Survey ||  || align=right | 2.6 km || 
|-id=544 bgcolor=#E9E9E9
| 528544 ||  || — || September 6, 2008 || Mount Lemmon || Mount Lemmon Survey ||  || align=right data-sort-value="0.86" | 860 m || 
|-id=545 bgcolor=#fefefe
| 528545 ||  || — || October 6, 2008 || Kitt Peak || Spacewatch ||  || align=right data-sort-value="0.55" | 550 m || 
|-id=546 bgcolor=#fefefe
| 528546 ||  || — || October 9, 2008 || Kitt Peak || Spacewatch ||  || align=right data-sort-value="0.43" | 430 m || 
|-id=547 bgcolor=#fefefe
| 528547 ||  || — || October 23, 2008 || Kitt Peak || Spacewatch ||  || align=right data-sort-value="0.48" | 480 m || 
|-id=548 bgcolor=#d6d6d6
| 528548 ||  || — || October 2, 2008 || Mount Lemmon || Mount Lemmon Survey ||  || align=right | 2.7 km || 
|-id=549 bgcolor=#E9E9E9
| 528549 ||  || — || October 25, 2008 || Kitt Peak || Spacewatch ||  || align=right | 1.8 km || 
|-id=550 bgcolor=#d6d6d6
| 528550 ||  || — || March 23, 2006 || Mount Lemmon || Mount Lemmon Survey ||  || align=right | 2.8 km || 
|-id=551 bgcolor=#fefefe
| 528551 ||  || — || October 25, 2008 || Kitt Peak || Spacewatch ||  || align=right data-sort-value="0.48" | 480 m || 
|-id=552 bgcolor=#fefefe
| 528552 ||  || — || October 25, 2008 || Kitt Peak || Spacewatch || H || align=right data-sort-value="0.39" | 390 m || 
|-id=553 bgcolor=#d6d6d6
| 528553 ||  || — || October 25, 2008 || Mount Lemmon || Mount Lemmon Survey ||  || align=right | 3.1 km || 
|-id=554 bgcolor=#d6d6d6
| 528554 ||  || — || October 10, 2008 || Mount Lemmon || Mount Lemmon Survey ||  || align=right | 1.9 km || 
|-id=555 bgcolor=#d6d6d6
| 528555 ||  || — || October 26, 2008 || Kitt Peak || Spacewatch ||  || align=right | 2.4 km || 
|-id=556 bgcolor=#E9E9E9
| 528556 ||  || — || October 26, 2008 || Kitt Peak || Spacewatch ||  || align=right | 1.8 km || 
|-id=557 bgcolor=#E9E9E9
| 528557 ||  || — || October 26, 2008 || Kitt Peak || Spacewatch ||  || align=right | 1.9 km || 
|-id=558 bgcolor=#E9E9E9
| 528558 ||  || — || October 26, 2008 || Kitt Peak || Spacewatch ||  || align=right | 1.0 km || 
|-id=559 bgcolor=#E9E9E9
| 528559 ||  || — || September 29, 2008 || Kitt Peak || Spacewatch ||  || align=right data-sort-value="0.83" | 830 m || 
|-id=560 bgcolor=#fefefe
| 528560 ||  || — || October 27, 2008 || Kitt Peak || Spacewatch ||  || align=right data-sort-value="0.48" | 480 m || 
|-id=561 bgcolor=#E9E9E9
| 528561 ||  || — || October 27, 2008 || Kitt Peak || Spacewatch ||  || align=right | 1.2 km || 
|-id=562 bgcolor=#d6d6d6
| 528562 ||  || — || October 27, 2008 || Kitt Peak || Spacewatch ||  || align=right | 2.0 km || 
|-id=563 bgcolor=#E9E9E9
| 528563 ||  || — || February 24, 2006 || Kitt Peak || Spacewatch ||  || align=right | 1.2 km || 
|-id=564 bgcolor=#fefefe
| 528564 ||  || — || October 27, 2008 || Mount Lemmon || Mount Lemmon Survey ||  || align=right data-sort-value="0.50" | 500 m || 
|-id=565 bgcolor=#E9E9E9
| 528565 ||  || — || October 28, 2008 || Kitt Peak || Spacewatch ||  || align=right | 1.7 km || 
|-id=566 bgcolor=#E9E9E9
| 528566 ||  || — || September 24, 2008 || Mount Lemmon || Mount Lemmon Survey ||  || align=right | 1.5 km || 
|-id=567 bgcolor=#d6d6d6
| 528567 ||  || — || October 28, 2008 || Kitt Peak || Spacewatch ||  || align=right | 1.7 km || 
|-id=568 bgcolor=#fefefe
| 528568 ||  || — || October 6, 2008 || Mount Lemmon || Mount Lemmon Survey ||  || align=right data-sort-value="0.55" | 550 m || 
|-id=569 bgcolor=#FA8072
| 528569 ||  || — || September 22, 2008 || Mount Lemmon || Mount Lemmon Survey ||  || align=right data-sort-value="0.51" | 510 m || 
|-id=570 bgcolor=#E9E9E9
| 528570 ||  || — || October 1, 2008 || Kitt Peak || Spacewatch ||  || align=right | 1.9 km || 
|-id=571 bgcolor=#fefefe
| 528571 ||  || — || October 28, 2008 || Mount Lemmon || Mount Lemmon Survey ||  || align=right data-sort-value="0.51" | 510 m || 
|-id=572 bgcolor=#d6d6d6
| 528572 ||  || — || October 28, 2008 || Kitt Peak || Spacewatch ||  || align=right | 2.1 km || 
|-id=573 bgcolor=#E9E9E9
| 528573 ||  || — || October 10, 2008 || Mount Lemmon || Mount Lemmon Survey ||  || align=right | 1.1 km || 
|-id=574 bgcolor=#d6d6d6
| 528574 ||  || — || October 29, 2008 || Kitt Peak || Spacewatch ||  || align=right | 1.3 km || 
|-id=575 bgcolor=#d6d6d6
| 528575 ||  || — || October 21, 2008 || Kitt Peak || Spacewatch ||  || align=right | 2.9 km || 
|-id=576 bgcolor=#d6d6d6
| 528576 ||  || — || October 29, 2008 || Kitt Peak || Spacewatch ||  || align=right | 2.1 km || 
|-id=577 bgcolor=#fefefe
| 528577 ||  || — || September 23, 2008 || Kitt Peak || Spacewatch ||  || align=right data-sort-value="0.68" | 680 m || 
|-id=578 bgcolor=#E9E9E9
| 528578 ||  || — || October 8, 2008 || Mount Lemmon || Mount Lemmon Survey ||  || align=right | 1.9 km || 
|-id=579 bgcolor=#fefefe
| 528579 ||  || — || October 31, 2008 || Catalina || CSS ||  || align=right data-sort-value="0.67" | 670 m || 
|-id=580 bgcolor=#d6d6d6
| 528580 ||  || — || October 23, 2008 || Mount Lemmon || Mount Lemmon Survey ||  || align=right | 3.0 km || 
|-id=581 bgcolor=#E9E9E9
| 528581 ||  || — || October 30, 2008 || Mount Lemmon || Mount Lemmon Survey ||  || align=right | 2.5 km || 
|-id=582 bgcolor=#E9E9E9
| 528582 ||  || — || October 1, 2008 || Kitt Peak || Spacewatch ||  || align=right | 1.9 km || 
|-id=583 bgcolor=#fefefe
| 528583 ||  || — || October 23, 2008 || Kitt Peak || Spacewatch ||  || align=right data-sort-value="0.53" | 530 m || 
|-id=584 bgcolor=#d6d6d6
| 528584 ||  || — || October 21, 2008 || Kitt Peak || Spacewatch ||  || align=right | 2.7 km || 
|-id=585 bgcolor=#E9E9E9
| 528585 ||  || — || October 23, 2008 || Kitt Peak || Spacewatch ||  || align=right | 1.1 km || 
|-id=586 bgcolor=#fefefe
| 528586 ||  || — || October 26, 2008 || Kitt Peak || Spacewatch ||  || align=right data-sort-value="0.60" | 600 m || 
|-id=587 bgcolor=#fefefe
| 528587 ||  || — || October 3, 2008 || Mount Lemmon || Mount Lemmon Survey ||  || align=right data-sort-value="0.53" | 530 m || 
|-id=588 bgcolor=#E9E9E9
| 528588 ||  || — || October 20, 2008 || Kitt Peak || Spacewatch ||  || align=right | 1.9 km || 
|-id=589 bgcolor=#E9E9E9
| 528589 ||  || — || September 29, 2008 || Mount Lemmon || Mount Lemmon Survey ||  || align=right | 2.0 km || 
|-id=590 bgcolor=#d6d6d6
| 528590 ||  || — || October 23, 2008 || Kitt Peak || Spacewatch ||  || align=right | 1.5 km || 
|-id=591 bgcolor=#d6d6d6
| 528591 ||  || — || October 1, 2008 || Mount Lemmon || Mount Lemmon Survey ||  || align=right | 2.2 km || 
|-id=592 bgcolor=#d6d6d6
| 528592 ||  || — || October 25, 2008 || Socorro || LINEAR ||  || align=right | 2.3 km || 
|-id=593 bgcolor=#d6d6d6
| 528593 ||  || — || October 24, 2008 || Kitt Peak || Spacewatch || KOR || align=right | 1.2 km || 
|-id=594 bgcolor=#fefefe
| 528594 ||  || — || October 25, 2008 || Kitt Peak || Spacewatch ||  || align=right data-sort-value="0.56" | 560 m || 
|-id=595 bgcolor=#d6d6d6
| 528595 ||  || — || October 23, 2008 || Kitt Peak || Spacewatch ||  || align=right | 2.0 km || 
|-id=596 bgcolor=#E9E9E9
| 528596 ||  || — || October 24, 2008 || Kitt Peak || Spacewatch || ADE || align=right | 1.8 km || 
|-id=597 bgcolor=#E9E9E9
| 528597 ||  || — || October 24, 2008 || Kitt Peak || Spacewatch ||  || align=right | 1.0 km || 
|-id=598 bgcolor=#d6d6d6
| 528598 ||  || — || October 28, 2008 || Kitt Peak || Spacewatch || EOS || align=right | 1.6 km || 
|-id=599 bgcolor=#E9E9E9
| 528599 ||  || — || October 26, 2008 || Catalina || CSS ||  || align=right | 2.4 km || 
|-id=600 bgcolor=#E9E9E9
| 528600 ||  || — || October 24, 2008 || Catalina || CSS || GEF || align=right | 1.4 km || 
|}

528601–528700 

|-bgcolor=#fefefe
| 528601 ||  || — || October 10, 2008 || Mount Lemmon || Mount Lemmon Survey ||  || align=right data-sort-value="0.57" | 570 m || 
|-id=602 bgcolor=#d6d6d6
| 528602 ||  || — || October 28, 2008 || Kitt Peak || Spacewatch ||  || align=right | 2.0 km || 
|-id=603 bgcolor=#E9E9E9
| 528603 ||  || — || October 20, 2008 || Kitt Peak || Spacewatch ||  || align=right | 2.1 km || 
|-id=604 bgcolor=#E9E9E9
| 528604 ||  || — || October 25, 2008 || Mount Lemmon || Mount Lemmon Survey ||  || align=right | 1.4 km || 
|-id=605 bgcolor=#E9E9E9
| 528605 ||  || — || October 23, 2008 || Mount Lemmon || Mount Lemmon Survey ||  || align=right | 2.3 km || 
|-id=606 bgcolor=#E9E9E9
| 528606 ||  || — || October 28, 2008 || Kitt Peak || Spacewatch ||  || align=right | 2.1 km || 
|-id=607 bgcolor=#E9E9E9
| 528607 ||  || — || October 21, 2008 || Kitt Peak || Spacewatch ||  || align=right | 2.3 km || 
|-id=608 bgcolor=#d6d6d6
| 528608 ||  || — || October 30, 2008 || Mount Lemmon || Mount Lemmon Survey ||  || align=right | 2.4 km || 
|-id=609 bgcolor=#FFC2E0
| 528609 ||  || — || November 7, 2008 || Catalina || CSS || APO +1km || align=right | 1.1 km || 
|-id=610 bgcolor=#E9E9E9
| 528610 ||  || — || November 2, 2008 || Mount Lemmon || Mount Lemmon Survey ||  || align=right | 2.5 km || 
|-id=611 bgcolor=#fefefe
| 528611 ||  || — || October 10, 2008 || Mount Lemmon || Mount Lemmon Survey ||  || align=right data-sort-value="0.57" | 570 m || 
|-id=612 bgcolor=#d6d6d6
| 528612 ||  || — || November 1, 2008 || Kitt Peak || Spacewatch ||  || align=right | 1.2 km || 
|-id=613 bgcolor=#E9E9E9
| 528613 ||  || — || September 23, 2008 || Kitt Peak || Spacewatch ||  || align=right | 1.5 km || 
|-id=614 bgcolor=#d6d6d6
| 528614 ||  || — || November 2, 2008 || Kitt Peak || Spacewatch ||  || align=right | 1.8 km || 
|-id=615 bgcolor=#d6d6d6
| 528615 ||  || — || October 25, 2008 || Kitt Peak || Spacewatch ||  || align=right | 1.8 km || 
|-id=616 bgcolor=#E9E9E9
| 528616 ||  || — || November 2, 2008 || Kitt Peak || Spacewatch ||  || align=right | 2.1 km || 
|-id=617 bgcolor=#fefefe
| 528617 ||  || — || October 25, 2008 || Catalina || CSS || H || align=right data-sort-value="0.72" | 720 m || 
|-id=618 bgcolor=#fefefe
| 528618 ||  || — || October 26, 2008 || Kitt Peak || Spacewatch ||  || align=right data-sort-value="0.67" | 670 m || 
|-id=619 bgcolor=#E9E9E9
| 528619 ||  || — || October 30, 2008 || Kitt Peak || Spacewatch ||  || align=right | 1.4 km || 
|-id=620 bgcolor=#E9E9E9
| 528620 ||  || — || November 4, 2008 || Kitt Peak || Spacewatch ||  || align=right | 1.5 km || 
|-id=621 bgcolor=#E9E9E9
| 528621 ||  || — || October 8, 2008 || Mount Lemmon || Mount Lemmon Survey ||  || align=right | 1.6 km || 
|-id=622 bgcolor=#E9E9E9
| 528622 ||  || — || November 6, 2008 || Mount Lemmon || Mount Lemmon Survey ||  || align=right | 1.7 km || 
|-id=623 bgcolor=#FA8072
| 528623 ||  || — || October 30, 2008 || Kitt Peak || Spacewatch || H || align=right data-sort-value="0.43" | 430 m || 
|-id=624 bgcolor=#fefefe
| 528624 ||  || — || September 29, 2008 || Catalina || CSS || H || align=right data-sort-value="0.71" | 710 m || 
|-id=625 bgcolor=#fefefe
| 528625 ||  || — || October 20, 2008 || Kitt Peak || Spacewatch ||  || align=right data-sort-value="0.44" | 440 m || 
|-id=626 bgcolor=#E9E9E9
| 528626 ||  || — || November 1, 2008 || Kitt Peak || Spacewatch ||  || align=right | 1.1 km || 
|-id=627 bgcolor=#fefefe
| 528627 ||  || — || November 8, 2008 || Kitt Peak || Spacewatch || H || align=right data-sort-value="0.49" | 490 m || 
|-id=628 bgcolor=#d6d6d6
| 528628 ||  || — || November 6, 2008 || Mount Lemmon || Mount Lemmon Survey ||  || align=right | 1.7 km || 
|-id=629 bgcolor=#d6d6d6
| 528629 ||  || — || November 7, 2008 || Mount Lemmon || Mount Lemmon Survey ||  || align=right | 2.4 km || 
|-id=630 bgcolor=#d6d6d6
| 528630 ||  || — || October 23, 2008 || Kitt Peak || Spacewatch || EOS || align=right | 1.3 km || 
|-id=631 bgcolor=#d6d6d6
| 528631 ||  || — || November 1, 2008 || Kitt Peak || Spacewatch ||  || align=right | 1.8 km || 
|-id=632 bgcolor=#d6d6d6
| 528632 ||  || — || November 6, 2008 || Kitt Peak || Spacewatch ||  || align=right | 3.5 km || 
|-id=633 bgcolor=#d6d6d6
| 528633 ||  || — || November 8, 2008 || Mount Lemmon || Mount Lemmon Survey ||  || align=right | 1.7 km || 
|-id=634 bgcolor=#E9E9E9
| 528634 ||  || — || November 7, 2008 || Mount Lemmon || Mount Lemmon Survey ||  || align=right | 1.6 km || 
|-id=635 bgcolor=#d6d6d6
| 528635 ||  || — || November 1, 2008 || Mount Lemmon || Mount Lemmon Survey ||  || align=right | 1.9 km || 
|-id=636 bgcolor=#fefefe
| 528636 ||  || — || November 6, 2008 || Mount Lemmon || Mount Lemmon Survey ||  || align=right data-sort-value="0.56" | 560 m || 
|-id=637 bgcolor=#d6d6d6
| 528637 ||  || — || November 6, 2008 || Mount Lemmon || Mount Lemmon Survey ||  || align=right | 2.9 km || 
|-id=638 bgcolor=#E9E9E9
| 528638 ||  || — || September 18, 2003 || Kitt Peak || Spacewatch ||  || align=right | 2.6 km || 
|-id=639 bgcolor=#fefefe
| 528639 ||  || — || November 1, 2008 || Mount Lemmon || Mount Lemmon Survey ||  || align=right data-sort-value="0.52" | 520 m || 
|-id=640 bgcolor=#E9E9E9
| 528640 ||  || — || November 9, 2008 || Kitt Peak || Spacewatch ||  || align=right | 1.9 km || 
|-id=641 bgcolor=#d6d6d6
| 528641 ||  || — || October 3, 2008 || Mount Lemmon || Mount Lemmon Survey ||  || align=right | 3.1 km || 
|-id=642 bgcolor=#fefefe
| 528642 ||  || — || November 17, 2008 || Kitt Peak || Spacewatch ||  || align=right data-sort-value="0.46" | 460 m || 
|-id=643 bgcolor=#E9E9E9
| 528643 ||  || — || November 8, 2008 || Mount Lemmon || Mount Lemmon Survey || HOF || align=right | 2.0 km || 
|-id=644 bgcolor=#d6d6d6
| 528644 ||  || — || November 17, 2008 || Kitt Peak || Spacewatch ||  || align=right | 1.7 km || 
|-id=645 bgcolor=#FA8072
| 528645 ||  || — || October 22, 2008 || Kitt Peak || Spacewatch || H || align=right data-sort-value="0.43" | 430 m || 
|-id=646 bgcolor=#d6d6d6
| 528646 ||  || — || October 27, 2008 || Kitt Peak || Spacewatch || EOS || align=right | 1.6 km || 
|-id=647 bgcolor=#d6d6d6
| 528647 ||  || — || October 28, 2008 || Kitt Peak || Spacewatch ||  || align=right | 2.3 km || 
|-id=648 bgcolor=#fefefe
| 528648 ||  || — || November 18, 2008 || Catalina || CSS ||  || align=right data-sort-value="0.46" | 460 m || 
|-id=649 bgcolor=#d6d6d6
| 528649 ||  || — || November 19, 2008 || Mount Lemmon || Mount Lemmon Survey ||  || align=right | 2.4 km || 
|-id=650 bgcolor=#FFC2E0
| 528650 ||  || — || November 2, 2008 || Mount Lemmon || Mount Lemmon Survey || APOcritical || align=right data-sort-value="0.49" | 490 m || 
|-id=651 bgcolor=#d6d6d6
| 528651 ||  || — || November 3, 2008 || Kitt Peak || Spacewatch ||  || align=right | 1.6 km || 
|-id=652 bgcolor=#d6d6d6
| 528652 ||  || — || October 30, 2008 || Kitt Peak || Spacewatch ||  || align=right | 2.3 km || 
|-id=653 bgcolor=#d6d6d6
| 528653 ||  || — || November 17, 2008 || Kitt Peak || Spacewatch ||  || align=right | 2.4 km || 
|-id=654 bgcolor=#E9E9E9
| 528654 ||  || — || October 6, 2008 || Mount Lemmon || Mount Lemmon Survey ||  || align=right | 1.4 km || 
|-id=655 bgcolor=#E9E9E9
| 528655 ||  || — || October 6, 2008 || Mount Lemmon || Mount Lemmon Survey ||  || align=right | 2.0 km || 
|-id=656 bgcolor=#d6d6d6
| 528656 ||  || — || October 23, 2008 || Mount Lemmon || Mount Lemmon Survey ||  || align=right | 2.6 km || 
|-id=657 bgcolor=#d6d6d6
| 528657 ||  || — || November 18, 2008 || Kitt Peak || Spacewatch ||  || align=right | 2.5 km || 
|-id=658 bgcolor=#d6d6d6
| 528658 ||  || — || November 18, 2008 || Kitt Peak || Spacewatch ||  || align=right | 2.8 km || 
|-id=659 bgcolor=#fefefe
| 528659 ||  || — || November 19, 2008 || Mount Lemmon || Mount Lemmon Survey ||  || align=right data-sort-value="0.59" | 590 m || 
|-id=660 bgcolor=#E9E9E9
| 528660 ||  || — || November 7, 2008 || Mount Lemmon || Mount Lemmon Survey ||  || align=right | 1.9 km || 
|-id=661 bgcolor=#fefefe
| 528661 ||  || — || November 7, 2008 || Mount Lemmon || Mount Lemmon Survey ||  || align=right data-sort-value="0.59" | 590 m || 
|-id=662 bgcolor=#d6d6d6
| 528662 ||  || — || December 17, 2003 || Kitt Peak || Spacewatch ||  || align=right | 2.1 km || 
|-id=663 bgcolor=#fefefe
| 528663 ||  || — || November 20, 2008 || Kitt Peak || Spacewatch ||  || align=right data-sort-value="0.51" | 510 m || 
|-id=664 bgcolor=#fefefe
| 528664 ||  || — || November 28, 2008 || Piszkéstető || K. Sárneczky, C. Orgel ||  || align=right data-sort-value="0.48" | 480 m || 
|-id=665 bgcolor=#E9E9E9
| 528665 ||  || — || October 28, 2008 || Kitt Peak || Spacewatch ||  || align=right | 2.2 km || 
|-id=666 bgcolor=#d6d6d6
| 528666 ||  || — || November 8, 2008 || Mount Lemmon || Mount Lemmon Survey ||  || align=right | 2.0 km || 
|-id=667 bgcolor=#fefefe
| 528667 ||  || — || September 28, 2008 || Mount Lemmon || Mount Lemmon Survey ||  || align=right data-sort-value="0.67" | 670 m || 
|-id=668 bgcolor=#d6d6d6
| 528668 ||  || — || October 30, 2008 || Kitt Peak || Spacewatch || EOS || align=right | 1.6 km || 
|-id=669 bgcolor=#fefefe
| 528669 ||  || — || October 26, 2008 || Kitt Peak || Spacewatch ||  || align=right data-sort-value="0.62" | 620 m || 
|-id=670 bgcolor=#d6d6d6
| 528670 ||  || — || November 30, 2008 || Kitt Peak || Spacewatch ||  || align=right | 2.4 km || 
|-id=671 bgcolor=#d6d6d6
| 528671 ||  || — || November 18, 2008 || Kitt Peak || Spacewatch ||  || align=right | 3.1 km || 
|-id=672 bgcolor=#E9E9E9
| 528672 ||  || — || November 30, 2008 || Mount Lemmon || Mount Lemmon Survey ||  || align=right | 1.9 km || 
|-id=673 bgcolor=#d6d6d6
| 528673 ||  || — || November 6, 2008 || Mount Lemmon || Mount Lemmon Survey ||  || align=right | 2.3 km || 
|-id=674 bgcolor=#d6d6d6
| 528674 ||  || — || November 21, 2008 || Mount Lemmon || Mount Lemmon Survey ||  || align=right | 2.8 km || 
|-id=675 bgcolor=#d6d6d6
| 528675 ||  || — || September 29, 2008 || Mount Lemmon || Mount Lemmon Survey || EOS || align=right | 1.8 km || 
|-id=676 bgcolor=#fefefe
| 528676 ||  || — || November 24, 2008 || Kitt Peak || Spacewatch ||  || align=right data-sort-value="0.68" | 680 m || 
|-id=677 bgcolor=#fefefe
| 528677 ||  || — || January 31, 2006 || Anderson Mesa || LONEOS ||  || align=right data-sort-value="0.76" | 760 m || 
|-id=678 bgcolor=#d6d6d6
| 528678 ||  || — || November 20, 2008 || Kitt Peak || Spacewatch ||  || align=right | 1.7 km || 
|-id=679 bgcolor=#d6d6d6
| 528679 ||  || — || November 18, 2008 || Kitt Peak || Spacewatch ||  || align=right | 1.6 km || 
|-id=680 bgcolor=#d6d6d6
| 528680 ||  || — || November 19, 2008 || Kitt Peak || Spacewatch ||  || align=right | 2.7 km || 
|-id=681 bgcolor=#d6d6d6
| 528681 ||  || — || November 24, 2008 || Mount Lemmon || Mount Lemmon Survey ||  || align=right | 1.7 km || 
|-id=682 bgcolor=#E9E9E9
| 528682 ||  || — || November 19, 2008 || Mount Lemmon || Mount Lemmon Survey ||  || align=right data-sort-value="0.90" | 900 m || 
|-id=683 bgcolor=#fefefe
| 528683 ||  || — || November 20, 2008 || Kitt Peak || Spacewatch ||  || align=right data-sort-value="0.82" | 820 m || 
|-id=684 bgcolor=#fefefe
| 528684 ||  || — || December 5, 2008 || Mount Lemmon || Mount Lemmon Survey || H || align=right data-sort-value="0.81" | 810 m || 
|-id=685 bgcolor=#d6d6d6
| 528685 ||  || — || October 28, 2008 || Kitt Peak || Spacewatch ||  || align=right | 2.1 km || 
|-id=686 bgcolor=#E9E9E9
| 528686 ||  || — || November 20, 2008 || Kitt Peak || Spacewatch ||  || align=right | 1.5 km || 
|-id=687 bgcolor=#E9E9E9
| 528687 ||  || — || November 19, 2008 || Kitt Peak || Spacewatch ||  || align=right | 1.1 km || 
|-id=688 bgcolor=#fefefe
| 528688 ||  || — || October 27, 2008 || Kitt Peak || Spacewatch ||  || align=right data-sort-value="0.58" | 580 m || 
|-id=689 bgcolor=#d6d6d6
| 528689 ||  || — || November 8, 2008 || Kitt Peak || Spacewatch || EOS || align=right | 1.6 km || 
|-id=690 bgcolor=#E9E9E9
| 528690 ||  || — || December 2, 2008 || Kitt Peak || Spacewatch ||  || align=right | 1.8 km || 
|-id=691 bgcolor=#d6d6d6
| 528691 ||  || — || December 3, 2008 || Catalina || CSS ||  || align=right | 2.0 km || 
|-id=692 bgcolor=#d6d6d6
| 528692 ||  || — || October 24, 2008 || Mount Lemmon || Mount Lemmon Survey ||  || align=right | 3.1 km || 
|-id=693 bgcolor=#d6d6d6
| 528693 ||  || — || December 2, 2008 || Kitt Peak || Spacewatch ||  || align=right | 2.6 km || 
|-id=694 bgcolor=#d6d6d6
| 528694 ||  || — || December 20, 2008 || Pla D'Arguines || R. Ferrando ||  || align=right | 2.3 km || 
|-id=695 bgcolor=#FA8072
| 528695 ||  || — || December 21, 2008 || Kitt Peak || Spacewatch || H || align=right data-sort-value="0.54" | 540 m || 
|-id=696 bgcolor=#E9E9E9
| 528696 ||  || — || December 22, 2008 || Calar Alto || F. Hormuth ||  || align=right | 2.0 km || 
|-id=697 bgcolor=#fefefe
| 528697 ||  || — || November 17, 2008 || Catalina || CSS ||  || align=right | 1.3 km || 
|-id=698 bgcolor=#d6d6d6
| 528698 ||  || — || December 23, 2008 || Weihai || Shandong University Obs. ||  || align=right | 4.3 km || 
|-id=699 bgcolor=#E9E9E9
| 528699 ||  || — || November 6, 2008 || Mount Lemmon || Mount Lemmon Survey ||  || align=right data-sort-value="0.93" | 930 m || 
|-id=700 bgcolor=#d6d6d6
| 528700 ||  || — || December 4, 2008 || Kitt Peak || Spacewatch ||  || align=right | 3.4 km || 
|}

528701–528800 

|-bgcolor=#fefefe
| 528701 ||  || — || December 21, 2008 || Kitt Peak || Spacewatch ||  || align=right data-sort-value="0.53" | 530 m || 
|-id=702 bgcolor=#fefefe
| 528702 ||  || — || December 21, 2008 || Mount Lemmon || Mount Lemmon Survey ||  || align=right data-sort-value="0.63" | 630 m || 
|-id=703 bgcolor=#d6d6d6
| 528703 ||  || — || December 21, 2008 || Kitt Peak || Spacewatch ||  || align=right | 3.2 km || 
|-id=704 bgcolor=#fefefe
| 528704 ||  || — || December 21, 2008 || Mount Lemmon || Mount Lemmon Survey || H || align=right data-sort-value="0.54" | 540 m || 
|-id=705 bgcolor=#d6d6d6
| 528705 ||  || — || December 21, 2008 || Mount Lemmon || Mount Lemmon Survey || EOS || align=right | 1.8 km || 
|-id=706 bgcolor=#fefefe
| 528706 ||  || — || November 24, 2008 || Kitt Peak || Spacewatch ||  || align=right data-sort-value="0.50" | 500 m || 
|-id=707 bgcolor=#d6d6d6
| 528707 ||  || — || August 10, 2007 || Kitt Peak || Spacewatch ||  || align=right | 1.9 km || 
|-id=708 bgcolor=#fefefe
| 528708 ||  || — || December 4, 2008 || Mount Lemmon || Mount Lemmon Survey ||  || align=right | 1.1 km || 
|-id=709 bgcolor=#d6d6d6
| 528709 ||  || — || December 22, 2008 || Kitt Peak || Spacewatch ||  || align=right | 2.4 km || 
|-id=710 bgcolor=#d6d6d6
| 528710 ||  || — || December 29, 2008 || Mount Lemmon || Mount Lemmon Survey ||  || align=right | 3.9 km || 
|-id=711 bgcolor=#d6d6d6
| 528711 ||  || — || December 21, 2008 || Kitt Peak || Spacewatch ||  || align=right | 2.0 km || 
|-id=712 bgcolor=#d6d6d6
| 528712 ||  || — || December 29, 2008 || Mount Lemmon || Mount Lemmon Survey ||  || align=right | 2.3 km || 
|-id=713 bgcolor=#d6d6d6
| 528713 ||  || — || September 10, 2007 || Kitt Peak || Spacewatch || THM || align=right | 2.0 km || 
|-id=714 bgcolor=#fefefe
| 528714 ||  || — || December 29, 2008 || Mount Lemmon || Mount Lemmon Survey ||  || align=right data-sort-value="0.56" | 560 m || 
|-id=715 bgcolor=#d6d6d6
| 528715 ||  || — || December 22, 2008 || Kitt Peak || Spacewatch ||  || align=right | 3.0 km || 
|-id=716 bgcolor=#d6d6d6
| 528716 ||  || — || December 30, 2008 || Mount Lemmon || Mount Lemmon Survey ||  || align=right | 2.3 km || 
|-id=717 bgcolor=#E9E9E9
| 528717 ||  || — || December 30, 2008 || Mount Lemmon || Mount Lemmon Survey ||  || align=right | 2.1 km || 
|-id=718 bgcolor=#d6d6d6
| 528718 ||  || — || December 30, 2008 || Mount Lemmon || Mount Lemmon Survey ||  || align=right | 2.8 km || 
|-id=719 bgcolor=#E9E9E9
| 528719 ||  || — || December 30, 2008 || Kitt Peak || Spacewatch ||  || align=right | 1.7 km || 
|-id=720 bgcolor=#d6d6d6
| 528720 ||  || — || December 30, 2008 || Mount Lemmon || Mount Lemmon Survey ||  || align=right | 1.6 km || 
|-id=721 bgcolor=#d6d6d6
| 528721 ||  || — || December 30, 2008 || Mount Lemmon || Mount Lemmon Survey ||  || align=right | 2.8 km || 
|-id=722 bgcolor=#E9E9E9
| 528722 ||  || — || December 3, 2008 || Mount Lemmon || Mount Lemmon Survey ||  || align=right | 1.9 km || 
|-id=723 bgcolor=#E9E9E9
| 528723 ||  || — || December 3, 2008 || Mount Lemmon || Mount Lemmon Survey ||  || align=right | 2.5 km || 
|-id=724 bgcolor=#d6d6d6
| 528724 ||  || — || December 3, 2008 || Mount Lemmon || Mount Lemmon Survey ||  || align=right | 2.6 km || 
|-id=725 bgcolor=#fefefe
| 528725 ||  || — || December 21, 2008 || Kitt Peak || Spacewatch ||  || align=right data-sort-value="0.62" | 620 m || 
|-id=726 bgcolor=#d6d6d6
| 528726 ||  || — || September 14, 2007 || Mount Lemmon || Mount Lemmon Survey ||  || align=right | 2.1 km || 
|-id=727 bgcolor=#fefefe
| 528727 ||  || — || December 21, 2008 || Mount Lemmon || Mount Lemmon Survey ||  || align=right data-sort-value="0.47" | 470 m || 
|-id=728 bgcolor=#E9E9E9
| 528728 ||  || — || December 22, 2008 || Kitt Peak || Spacewatch ||  || align=right | 1.4 km || 
|-id=729 bgcolor=#fefefe
| 528729 ||  || — || December 29, 2008 || Kitt Peak || Spacewatch ||  || align=right data-sort-value="0.55" | 550 m || 
|-id=730 bgcolor=#d6d6d6
| 528730 ||  || — || December 29, 2008 || Kitt Peak || Spacewatch ||  || align=right | 2.1 km || 
|-id=731 bgcolor=#d6d6d6
| 528731 ||  || — || December 29, 2008 || Kitt Peak || Spacewatch ||  || align=right | 2.2 km || 
|-id=732 bgcolor=#d6d6d6
| 528732 ||  || — || December 29, 2008 || Kitt Peak || Spacewatch ||  || align=right | 2.4 km || 
|-id=733 bgcolor=#fefefe
| 528733 ||  || — || December 22, 2008 || Kitt Peak || Spacewatch ||  || align=right data-sort-value="0.68" | 680 m || 
|-id=734 bgcolor=#d6d6d6
| 528734 ||  || — || December 22, 2008 || Kitt Peak || Spacewatch ||  || align=right | 1.6 km || 
|-id=735 bgcolor=#fefefe
| 528735 ||  || — || December 22, 2008 || Kitt Peak || Spacewatch ||  || align=right data-sort-value="0.45" | 450 m || 
|-id=736 bgcolor=#FA8072
| 528736 ||  || — || December 30, 2008 || Kitt Peak || Spacewatch ||  || align=right data-sort-value="0.99" | 990 m || 
|-id=737 bgcolor=#E9E9E9
| 528737 ||  || — || December 4, 2008 || Kitt Peak || Spacewatch || DOR || align=right | 1.9 km || 
|-id=738 bgcolor=#d6d6d6
| 528738 ||  || — || December 22, 2008 || Kitt Peak || Spacewatch ||  || align=right | 2.1 km || 
|-id=739 bgcolor=#d6d6d6
| 528739 ||  || — || December 22, 2008 || Kitt Peak || Spacewatch ||  || align=right | 2.9 km || 
|-id=740 bgcolor=#fefefe
| 528740 ||  || — || December 30, 2008 || Kitt Peak || Spacewatch ||  || align=right data-sort-value="0.52" | 520 m || 
|-id=741 bgcolor=#d6d6d6
| 528741 ||  || — || October 31, 2008 || Mount Lemmon || Mount Lemmon Survey ||  || align=right | 3.0 km || 
|-id=742 bgcolor=#d6d6d6
| 528742 ||  || — || December 1, 2008 || Mount Lemmon || Mount Lemmon Survey ||  || align=right | 3.3 km || 
|-id=743 bgcolor=#d6d6d6
| 528743 ||  || — || December 21, 2008 || Kitt Peak || Spacewatch ||  || align=right | 3.2 km || 
|-id=744 bgcolor=#d6d6d6
| 528744 ||  || — || December 21, 2008 || Mount Lemmon || Mount Lemmon Survey ||  || align=right | 2.4 km || 
|-id=745 bgcolor=#fefefe
| 528745 ||  || — || December 22, 2008 || Kitt Peak || Spacewatch ||  || align=right data-sort-value="0.62" | 620 m || 
|-id=746 bgcolor=#fefefe
| 528746 ||  || — || December 21, 2008 || Mount Lemmon || Mount Lemmon Survey ||  || align=right data-sort-value="0.58" | 580 m || 
|-id=747 bgcolor=#d6d6d6
| 528747 ||  || — || December 30, 2008 || Kitt Peak || Spacewatch || EOS || align=right | 1.5 km || 
|-id=748 bgcolor=#d6d6d6
| 528748 ||  || — || November 19, 2008 || Mount Lemmon || Mount Lemmon Survey ||  || align=right | 2.5 km || 
|-id=749 bgcolor=#d6d6d6
| 528749 ||  || — || December 21, 2008 || Kitt Peak || Spacewatch ||  || align=right | 1.9 km || 
|-id=750 bgcolor=#E9E9E9
| 528750 ||  || — || December 21, 2008 || Mount Lemmon || Mount Lemmon Survey ||  || align=right | 1.6 km || 
|-id=751 bgcolor=#E9E9E9
| 528751 ||  || — || September 15, 2007 || Mount Lemmon || Mount Lemmon Survey ||  || align=right | 1.6 km || 
|-id=752 bgcolor=#d6d6d6
| 528752 ||  || — || December 22, 2008 || Kitt Peak || Spacewatch ||  || align=right | 1.8 km || 
|-id=753 bgcolor=#d6d6d6
| 528753 ||  || — || December 21, 2008 || Kitt Peak || Spacewatch ||  || align=right | 2.3 km || 
|-id=754 bgcolor=#d6d6d6
| 528754 ||  || — || December 22, 2008 || Kitt Peak || Spacewatch ||  || align=right | 2.5 km || 
|-id=755 bgcolor=#d6d6d6
| 528755 ||  || — || September 11, 2007 || Mount Lemmon || Mount Lemmon Survey ||  || align=right | 3.6 km || 
|-id=756 bgcolor=#FFC2E0
| 528756 ||  || — || January 1, 2009 || Mount Lemmon || Mount Lemmon Survey || AMO || align=right data-sort-value="0.77" | 770 m || 
|-id=757 bgcolor=#fefefe
| 528757 ||  || — || January 1, 2009 || Kitt Peak || Spacewatch ||  || align=right data-sort-value="0.57" | 570 m || 
|-id=758 bgcolor=#d6d6d6
| 528758 ||  || — || December 5, 2008 || Mount Lemmon || Mount Lemmon Survey ||  || align=right | 2.0 km || 
|-id=759 bgcolor=#fefefe
| 528759 ||  || — || January 2, 2009 || Kitt Peak || Spacewatch ||  || align=right data-sort-value="0.50" | 500 m || 
|-id=760 bgcolor=#d6d6d6
| 528760 ||  || — || January 2, 2009 || Kitt Peak || Spacewatch ||  || align=right | 2.8 km || 
|-id=761 bgcolor=#d6d6d6
| 528761 ||  || — || December 4, 2008 || Mount Lemmon || Mount Lemmon Survey ||  || align=right | 2.9 km || 
|-id=762 bgcolor=#d6d6d6
| 528762 ||  || — || December 4, 2008 || Mount Lemmon || Mount Lemmon Survey ||  || align=right | 1.6 km || 
|-id=763 bgcolor=#d6d6d6
| 528763 ||  || — || December 22, 2008 || Mount Lemmon || Mount Lemmon Survey ||  || align=right | 2.1 km || 
|-id=764 bgcolor=#d6d6d6
| 528764 ||  || — || January 15, 2009 || Kitt Peak || Spacewatch ||  || align=right | 2.4 km || 
|-id=765 bgcolor=#d6d6d6
| 528765 ||  || — || December 21, 2008 || Kitt Peak || Spacewatch ||  || align=right | 2.7 km || 
|-id=766 bgcolor=#d6d6d6
| 528766 ||  || — || December 4, 2008 || Mount Lemmon || Mount Lemmon Survey ||  || align=right | 2.0 km || 
|-id=767 bgcolor=#d6d6d6
| 528767 ||  || — || January 1, 2009 || Mount Lemmon || Mount Lemmon Survey || 7:4 || align=right | 3.6 km || 
|-id=768 bgcolor=#E9E9E9
| 528768 ||  || — || January 3, 2009 || Kitt Peak || Spacewatch || AGN || align=right | 1.0 km || 
|-id=769 bgcolor=#d6d6d6
| 528769 ||  || — || January 1, 2009 || Kitt Peak || Spacewatch ||  || align=right | 2.3 km || 
|-id=770 bgcolor=#d6d6d6
| 528770 ||  || — || January 3, 2009 || Kitt Peak || Spacewatch ||  || align=right | 1.8 km || 
|-id=771 bgcolor=#d6d6d6
| 528771 ||  || — || December 21, 2008 || Mount Lemmon || Mount Lemmon Survey ||  || align=right | 2.7 km || 
|-id=772 bgcolor=#E9E9E9
| 528772 ||  || — || January 15, 2009 || Kitt Peak || Spacewatch ||  || align=right | 3.0 km || 
|-id=773 bgcolor=#d6d6d6
| 528773 ||  || — || January 2, 2009 || Mount Lemmon || Mount Lemmon Survey ||  || align=right | 2.6 km || 
|-id=774 bgcolor=#fefefe
| 528774 ||  || — || January 2, 2009 || Mount Lemmon || Mount Lemmon Survey ||  || align=right data-sort-value="0.69" | 690 m || 
|-id=775 bgcolor=#d6d6d6
| 528775 ||  || — || January 18, 2009 || Socorro || LINEAR ||  || align=right | 2.6 km || 
|-id=776 bgcolor=#d6d6d6
| 528776 ||  || — || December 22, 2008 || Mount Lemmon || Mount Lemmon Survey ||  || align=right | 3.0 km || 
|-id=777 bgcolor=#d6d6d6
| 528777 ||  || — || October 30, 2008 || Mount Lemmon || Mount Lemmon Survey ||  || align=right | 2.5 km || 
|-id=778 bgcolor=#FA8072
| 528778 ||  || — || January 26, 2009 || Socorro || LINEAR || H || align=right data-sort-value="0.88" | 880 m || 
|-id=779 bgcolor=#fefefe
| 528779 ||  || — || December 29, 2008 || Catalina || CSS ||  || align=right | 1.1 km || 
|-id=780 bgcolor=#d6d6d6
| 528780 ||  || — || December 31, 2008 || Kitt Peak || Spacewatch ||  || align=right | 2.9 km || 
|-id=781 bgcolor=#d6d6d6
| 528781 ||  || — || December 21, 2008 || Mount Lemmon || Mount Lemmon Survey ||  || align=right | 1.9 km || 
|-id=782 bgcolor=#d6d6d6
| 528782 ||  || — || January 16, 2009 || Mount Lemmon || Mount Lemmon Survey || THM || align=right | 1.9 km || 
|-id=783 bgcolor=#d6d6d6
| 528783 ||  || — || January 1, 2009 || Mount Lemmon || Mount Lemmon Survey ||  || align=right | 2.5 km || 
|-id=784 bgcolor=#fefefe
| 528784 ||  || — || January 17, 2009 || Kitt Peak || Spacewatch ||  || align=right data-sort-value="0.64" | 640 m || 
|-id=785 bgcolor=#d6d6d6
| 528785 ||  || — || January 17, 2009 || Kitt Peak || Spacewatch ||  || align=right | 2.6 km || 
|-id=786 bgcolor=#fefefe
| 528786 ||  || — || December 31, 2008 || Mount Lemmon || Mount Lemmon Survey ||  || align=right data-sort-value="0.66" | 660 m || 
|-id=787 bgcolor=#E9E9E9
| 528787 ||  || — || January 16, 2009 || Kitt Peak || Spacewatch || AST || align=right | 1.3 km || 
|-id=788 bgcolor=#d6d6d6
| 528788 ||  || — || January 16, 2009 || Kitt Peak || Spacewatch || THM || align=right | 1.9 km || 
|-id=789 bgcolor=#d6d6d6
| 528789 ||  || — || January 16, 2009 || Kitt Peak || Spacewatch ||  || align=right | 2.4 km || 
|-id=790 bgcolor=#d6d6d6
| 528790 ||  || — || January 16, 2009 || Kitt Peak || Spacewatch ||  || align=right | 2.2 km || 
|-id=791 bgcolor=#d6d6d6
| 528791 ||  || — || January 16, 2009 || Kitt Peak || Spacewatch ||  || align=right | 2.3 km || 
|-id=792 bgcolor=#FA8072
| 528792 ||  || — || January 1, 2009 || Mount Lemmon || Mount Lemmon Survey ||  || align=right data-sort-value="0.88" | 880 m || 
|-id=793 bgcolor=#d6d6d6
| 528793 ||  || — || January 16, 2009 || Kitt Peak || Spacewatch ||  || align=right | 2.7 km || 
|-id=794 bgcolor=#d6d6d6
| 528794 ||  || — || January 16, 2009 || Kitt Peak || Spacewatch ||  || align=right | 2.0 km || 
|-id=795 bgcolor=#fefefe
| 528795 ||  || — || January 16, 2009 || Kitt Peak || Spacewatch || NYS || align=right data-sort-value="0.46" | 460 m || 
|-id=796 bgcolor=#fefefe
| 528796 ||  || — || January 16, 2009 || Kitt Peak || Spacewatch ||  || align=right data-sort-value="0.50" | 500 m || 
|-id=797 bgcolor=#fefefe
| 528797 ||  || — || January 16, 2009 || Kitt Peak || Spacewatch ||  || align=right data-sort-value="0.63" | 630 m || 
|-id=798 bgcolor=#d6d6d6
| 528798 ||  || — || January 16, 2009 || Mount Lemmon || Mount Lemmon Survey ||  || align=right | 1.9 km || 
|-id=799 bgcolor=#d6d6d6
| 528799 ||  || — || January 16, 2009 || Mount Lemmon || Mount Lemmon Survey ||  || align=right | 2.0 km || 
|-id=800 bgcolor=#d6d6d6
| 528800 ||  || — || December 30, 2008 || Mount Lemmon || Mount Lemmon Survey ||  || align=right | 2.8 km || 
|}

528801–528900 

|-bgcolor=#d6d6d6
| 528801 ||  || — || January 1, 2009 || Mount Lemmon || Mount Lemmon Survey ||  || align=right | 1.9 km || 
|-id=802 bgcolor=#d6d6d6
| 528802 ||  || — || January 3, 2009 || Kitt Peak || Spacewatch ||  || align=right | 2.4 km || 
|-id=803 bgcolor=#d6d6d6
| 528803 ||  || — || January 17, 2009 || Mount Lemmon || Mount Lemmon Survey ||  || align=right | 2.3 km || 
|-id=804 bgcolor=#FFC2E0
| 528804 ||  || — || January 29, 2009 || Catalina || CSS || APOPHA || align=right data-sort-value="0.56" | 560 m || 
|-id=805 bgcolor=#d6d6d6
| 528805 ||  || — || January 17, 2009 || La Sagra || OAM Obs. ||  || align=right | 2.7 km || 
|-id=806 bgcolor=#fefefe
| 528806 ||  || — || January 18, 2009 || Kitt Peak || Spacewatch ||  || align=right data-sort-value="0.51" | 510 m || 
|-id=807 bgcolor=#FFC2E0
| 528807 ||  || — || January 30, 2009 || Catalina || CSS || ATEcritical || align=right data-sort-value="0.14" | 140 m || 
|-id=808 bgcolor=#FA8072
| 528808 ||  || — || January 27, 2009 || Cerro Burek || Alianza S4 Obs. ||  || align=right data-sort-value="0.78" | 780 m || 
|-id=809 bgcolor=#E9E9E9
| 528809 ||  || — || January 18, 2009 || Kitt Peak || Spacewatch || DOR || align=right | 1.9 km || 
|-id=810 bgcolor=#fefefe
| 528810 ||  || — || January 20, 2009 || Catalina || CSS ||  || align=right data-sort-value="0.75" | 750 m || 
|-id=811 bgcolor=#d6d6d6
| 528811 ||  || — || January 20, 2009 || Kitt Peak || Spacewatch ||  || align=right | 2.5 km || 
|-id=812 bgcolor=#fefefe
| 528812 ||  || — || January 15, 2009 || Kitt Peak || Spacewatch ||  || align=right data-sort-value="0.79" | 790 m || 
|-id=813 bgcolor=#fefefe
| 528813 ||  || — || January 25, 2009 || Kitt Peak || Spacewatch ||  || align=right data-sort-value="0.48" | 480 m || 
|-id=814 bgcolor=#fefefe
| 528814 ||  || — || January 15, 2009 || Kitt Peak || Spacewatch ||  || align=right data-sort-value="0.58" | 580 m || 
|-id=815 bgcolor=#d6d6d6
| 528815 ||  || — || January 25, 2009 || Kitt Peak || Spacewatch ||  || align=right | 2.5 km || 
|-id=816 bgcolor=#d6d6d6
| 528816 ||  || — || October 26, 2008 || Kitt Peak || Spacewatch ||  || align=right | 3.9 km || 
|-id=817 bgcolor=#E9E9E9
| 528817 ||  || — || January 29, 2009 || Kitt Peak || Spacewatch || AGN || align=right data-sort-value="0.95" | 950 m || 
|-id=818 bgcolor=#fefefe
| 528818 ||  || — || January 25, 2009 || Kitt Peak || Spacewatch ||  || align=right data-sort-value="0.53" | 530 m || 
|-id=819 bgcolor=#d6d6d6
| 528819 ||  || — || January 16, 2009 || Kitt Peak || Spacewatch ||  || align=right | 2.5 km || 
|-id=820 bgcolor=#fefefe
| 528820 ||  || — || January 31, 2009 || Mount Lemmon || Mount Lemmon Survey ||  || align=right data-sort-value="0.58" | 580 m || 
|-id=821 bgcolor=#d6d6d6
| 528821 ||  || — || January 16, 2009 || Mount Lemmon || Mount Lemmon Survey ||  || align=right | 2.5 km || 
|-id=822 bgcolor=#d6d6d6
| 528822 ||  || — || December 31, 2008 || Mount Lemmon || Mount Lemmon Survey ||  || align=right | 2.2 km || 
|-id=823 bgcolor=#fefefe
| 528823 ||  || — || December 22, 2008 || Kitt Peak || Spacewatch ||  || align=right data-sort-value="0.57" | 570 m || 
|-id=824 bgcolor=#d6d6d6
| 528824 ||  || — || December 31, 2008 || Mount Lemmon || Mount Lemmon Survey ||  || align=right | 2.8 km || 
|-id=825 bgcolor=#d6d6d6
| 528825 ||  || — || January 20, 2009 || Kitt Peak || Spacewatch ||  || align=right | 1.9 km || 
|-id=826 bgcolor=#d6d6d6
| 528826 ||  || — || January 31, 2009 || Kitt Peak || Spacewatch ||  || align=right | 3.3 km || 
|-id=827 bgcolor=#d6d6d6
| 528827 ||  || — || January 29, 2009 || Kitt Peak || Spacewatch ||  || align=right | 1.8 km || 
|-id=828 bgcolor=#d6d6d6
| 528828 ||  || — || November 21, 2008 || Mount Lemmon || Mount Lemmon Survey ||  || align=right | 3.1 km || 
|-id=829 bgcolor=#d6d6d6
| 528829 ||  || — || January 29, 2009 || Kitt Peak || Spacewatch ||  || align=right | 1.7 km || 
|-id=830 bgcolor=#d6d6d6
| 528830 ||  || — || January 15, 2009 || Kitt Peak || Spacewatch ||  || align=right | 2.2 km || 
|-id=831 bgcolor=#d6d6d6
| 528831 ||  || — || December 29, 2008 || Mount Lemmon || Mount Lemmon Survey ||  || align=right | 2.5 km || 
|-id=832 bgcolor=#d6d6d6
| 528832 ||  || — || January 16, 2009 || Mount Lemmon || Mount Lemmon Survey || THM || align=right | 2.1 km || 
|-id=833 bgcolor=#d6d6d6
| 528833 ||  || — || December 30, 2008 || Mount Lemmon || Mount Lemmon Survey ||  || align=right | 2.5 km || 
|-id=834 bgcolor=#FA8072
| 528834 ||  || — || January 30, 2009 || Kitt Peak || Spacewatch || H || align=right data-sort-value="0.36" | 360 m || 
|-id=835 bgcolor=#d6d6d6
| 528835 ||  || — || January 30, 2009 || Kitt Peak || Spacewatch || THM || align=right | 2.0 km || 
|-id=836 bgcolor=#d6d6d6
| 528836 ||  || — || January 20, 2009 || Kitt Peak || Spacewatch ||  || align=right | 3.1 km || 
|-id=837 bgcolor=#FA8072
| 528837 ||  || — || January 30, 2009 || Kitt Peak || Spacewatch || H || align=right data-sort-value="0.46" | 460 m || 
|-id=838 bgcolor=#d6d6d6
| 528838 ||  || — || January 16, 2009 || Kitt Peak || Spacewatch ||  || align=right | 1.9 km || 
|-id=839 bgcolor=#fefefe
| 528839 ||  || — || January 16, 2009 || Mount Lemmon || Mount Lemmon Survey ||  || align=right data-sort-value="0.67" | 670 m || 
|-id=840 bgcolor=#fefefe
| 528840 ||  || — || March 25, 2006 || Kitt Peak || Spacewatch ||  || align=right data-sort-value="0.51" | 510 m || 
|-id=841 bgcolor=#fefefe
| 528841 ||  || — || December 31, 2008 || Mount Lemmon || Mount Lemmon Survey || H || align=right data-sort-value="0.60" | 600 m || 
|-id=842 bgcolor=#d6d6d6
| 528842 ||  || — || September 18, 2006 || Kitt Peak || Spacewatch ||  || align=right | 2.9 km || 
|-id=843 bgcolor=#d6d6d6
| 528843 ||  || — || January 16, 2009 || Mount Lemmon || Mount Lemmon Survey ||  || align=right | 1.6 km || 
|-id=844 bgcolor=#d6d6d6
| 528844 ||  || — || January 19, 2009 || Mount Lemmon || Mount Lemmon Survey ||  || align=right | 2.5 km || 
|-id=845 bgcolor=#d6d6d6
| 528845 ||  || — || January 17, 2009 || Kitt Peak || Spacewatch ||  || align=right | 2.1 km || 
|-id=846 bgcolor=#d6d6d6
| 528846 ||  || — || January 20, 2009 || Catalina || CSS ||  || align=right | 2.6 km || 
|-id=847 bgcolor=#d6d6d6
| 528847 ||  || — || October 11, 2007 || Kitt Peak || Spacewatch ||  || align=right | 2.5 km || 
|-id=848 bgcolor=#fefefe
| 528848 ||  || — || January 26, 2009 || Socorro || LINEAR ||  || align=right data-sort-value="0.63" | 630 m || 
|-id=849 bgcolor=#d6d6d6
| 528849 ||  || — || October 21, 2007 || Mount Lemmon || Mount Lemmon Survey ||  || align=right | 2.5 km || 
|-id=850 bgcolor=#d6d6d6
| 528850 ||  || — || January 16, 2009 || Kitt Peak || Spacewatch ||  || align=right | 2.2 km || 
|-id=851 bgcolor=#fefefe
| 528851 ||  || — || January 25, 2009 || Kitt Peak || Spacewatch ||  || align=right data-sort-value="0.75" | 750 m || 
|-id=852 bgcolor=#d6d6d6
| 528852 ||  || — || January 25, 2009 || Kitt Peak || Spacewatch ||  || align=right | 2.6 km || 
|-id=853 bgcolor=#fefefe
| 528853 ||  || — || January 31, 2009 || Mount Lemmon || Mount Lemmon Survey ||  || align=right data-sort-value="0.81" | 810 m || 
|-id=854 bgcolor=#d6d6d6
| 528854 ||  || — || November 1, 2007 || Mount Lemmon || Mount Lemmon Survey ||  || align=right | 2.1 km || 
|-id=855 bgcolor=#E9E9E9
| 528855 ||  || — || January 20, 2009 || Mount Lemmon || Mount Lemmon Survey ||  || align=right | 1.8 km || 
|-id=856 bgcolor=#d6d6d6
| 528856 ||  || — || January 31, 2009 || Mount Lemmon || Mount Lemmon Survey ||  || align=right | 2.3 km || 
|-id=857 bgcolor=#FFC2E0
| 528857 ||  || — || February 2, 2009 || Catalina || CSS || APO || align=right data-sort-value="0.42" | 420 m || 
|-id=858 bgcolor=#FA8072
| 528858 ||  || — || February 4, 2009 || Kitt Peak || Spacewatch ||  || align=right data-sort-value="0.45" | 450 m || 
|-id=859 bgcolor=#FFC2E0
| 528859 ||  || — || February 14, 2009 || Kitt Peak || Spacewatch || APO || align=right data-sort-value="0.13" | 130 m || 
|-id=860 bgcolor=#d6d6d6
| 528860 ||  || — || February 1, 2009 || Mount Lemmon || Mount Lemmon Survey ||  || align=right | 2.3 km || 
|-id=861 bgcolor=#fefefe
| 528861 ||  || — || December 23, 2001 || Kitt Peak || Spacewatch ||  || align=right data-sort-value="0.77" | 770 m || 
|-id=862 bgcolor=#d6d6d6
| 528862 ||  || — || January 3, 2009 || Mount Lemmon || Mount Lemmon Survey ||  || align=right | 2.2 km || 
|-id=863 bgcolor=#d6d6d6
| 528863 ||  || — || February 1, 2009 || Kitt Peak || Spacewatch ||  || align=right | 2.4 km || 
|-id=864 bgcolor=#E9E9E9
| 528864 ||  || — || November 23, 2008 || Mount Lemmon || Mount Lemmon Survey ||  || align=right | 1.9 km || 
|-id=865 bgcolor=#d6d6d6
| 528865 ||  || — || February 2, 2009 || Mount Lemmon || Mount Lemmon Survey ||  || align=right | 2.4 km || 
|-id=866 bgcolor=#d6d6d6
| 528866 ||  || — || October 31, 2008 || Mount Lemmon || Mount Lemmon Survey ||  || align=right | 2.1 km || 
|-id=867 bgcolor=#E9E9E9
| 528867 ||  || — || January 25, 2009 || Socorro || LINEAR ||  || align=right | 2.9 km || 
|-id=868 bgcolor=#d6d6d6
| 528868 ||  || — || December 22, 2008 || Kitt Peak || Spacewatch || HYG || align=right | 2.0 km || 
|-id=869 bgcolor=#d6d6d6
| 528869 ||  || — || January 29, 2009 || Mount Lemmon || Mount Lemmon Survey ||  || align=right | 2.4 km || 
|-id=870 bgcolor=#d6d6d6
| 528870 ||  || — || January 2, 2009 || Mount Lemmon || Mount Lemmon Survey ||  || align=right | 2.9 km || 
|-id=871 bgcolor=#d6d6d6
| 528871 ||  || — || December 29, 2008 || Mount Lemmon || Mount Lemmon Survey ||  || align=right | 3.3 km || 
|-id=872 bgcolor=#d6d6d6
| 528872 ||  || — || February 14, 2009 || Mount Lemmon || Mount Lemmon Survey ||  || align=right | 1.8 km || 
|-id=873 bgcolor=#d6d6d6
| 528873 ||  || — || January 25, 2009 || Catalina || CSS || EUP || align=right | 3.2 km || 
|-id=874 bgcolor=#d6d6d6
| 528874 ||  || — || December 21, 2008 || Kitt Peak || Spacewatch ||  || align=right | 3.0 km || 
|-id=875 bgcolor=#d6d6d6
| 528875 ||  || — || January 18, 2009 || Kitt Peak || Spacewatch ||  || align=right | 2.6 km || 
|-id=876 bgcolor=#d6d6d6
| 528876 ||  || — || February 3, 2009 || Kitt Peak || Spacewatch ||  || align=right | 1.9 km || 
|-id=877 bgcolor=#d6d6d6
| 528877 ||  || — || February 5, 2009 || Mount Lemmon || Mount Lemmon Survey || EUP || align=right | 3.2 km || 
|-id=878 bgcolor=#d6d6d6
| 528878 ||  || — || February 1, 2009 || Kitt Peak || Spacewatch ||  || align=right | 2.2 km || 
|-id=879 bgcolor=#d6d6d6
| 528879 ||  || — || February 1, 2009 || Mount Lemmon || Mount Lemmon Survey ||  || align=right | 2.3 km || 
|-id=880 bgcolor=#d6d6d6
| 528880 ||  || — || August 21, 2006 || Kitt Peak || Spacewatch ||  || align=right | 2.6 km || 
|-id=881 bgcolor=#fefefe
| 528881 ||  || — || January 1, 2009 || Mount Lemmon || Mount Lemmon Survey ||  || align=right data-sort-value="0.67" | 670 m || 
|-id=882 bgcolor=#fefefe
| 528882 ||  || — || December 3, 2008 || Mount Lemmon || Mount Lemmon Survey ||  || align=right data-sort-value="0.62" | 620 m || 
|-id=883 bgcolor=#E9E9E9
| 528883 ||  || — || February 19, 2009 || Kitt Peak || Spacewatch ||  || align=right | 1.8 km || 
|-id=884 bgcolor=#d6d6d6
| 528884 ||  || — || February 19, 2009 || Kitt Peak || Spacewatch ||  || align=right | 2.2 km || 
|-id=885 bgcolor=#fefefe
| 528885 ||  || — || January 3, 2009 || Mount Lemmon || Mount Lemmon Survey ||  || align=right data-sort-value="0.65" | 650 m || 
|-id=886 bgcolor=#d6d6d6
| 528886 ||  || — || February 1, 2009 || Kitt Peak || Spacewatch ||  || align=right | 2.4 km || 
|-id=887 bgcolor=#d6d6d6
| 528887 ||  || — || February 1, 2009 || Kitt Peak || Spacewatch || KOR || align=right | 1.1 km || 
|-id=888 bgcolor=#fefefe
| 528888 ||  || — || February 21, 2009 || Mount Lemmon || Mount Lemmon Survey ||  || align=right data-sort-value="0.65" | 650 m || 
|-id=889 bgcolor=#fefefe
| 528889 ||  || — || February 20, 2009 || Kitt Peak || Spacewatch ||  || align=right data-sort-value="0.69" | 690 m || 
|-id=890 bgcolor=#d6d6d6
| 528890 ||  || — || February 21, 2009 || Kitt Peak || Spacewatch ||  || align=right | 2.7 km || 
|-id=891 bgcolor=#E9E9E9
| 528891 ||  || — || January 15, 2009 || Kitt Peak || Spacewatch || HOF || align=right | 2.2 km || 
|-id=892 bgcolor=#fefefe
| 528892 ||  || — || February 19, 2009 || La Sagra || OAM Obs. || H || align=right data-sort-value="0.56" | 560 m || 
|-id=893 bgcolor=#d6d6d6
| 528893 ||  || — || February 2, 2009 || Catalina || CSS ||  || align=right | 1.7 km || 
|-id=894 bgcolor=#d6d6d6
| 528894 ||  || — || February 22, 2009 || Socorro || LINEAR ||  || align=right | 3.2 km || 
|-id=895 bgcolor=#d6d6d6
| 528895 ||  || — || February 27, 2009 || Catalina || CSS ||  || align=right | 2.2 km || 
|-id=896 bgcolor=#d6d6d6
| 528896 ||  || — || February 19, 2009 || Catalina || CSS ||  || align=right | 2.5 km || 
|-id=897 bgcolor=#d6d6d6
| 528897 ||  || — || December 22, 2008 || Mount Lemmon || Mount Lemmon Survey ||  || align=right | 2.4 km || 
|-id=898 bgcolor=#d6d6d6
| 528898 ||  || — || February 22, 2009 || Kitt Peak || Spacewatch || THM || align=right | 1.7 km || 
|-id=899 bgcolor=#d6d6d6
| 528899 ||  || — || February 1, 2009 || Kitt Peak || Spacewatch ||  || align=right | 3.0 km || 
|-id=900 bgcolor=#d6d6d6
| 528900 ||  || — || January 25, 2009 || Kitt Peak || Spacewatch ||  || align=right | 2.1 km || 
|}

528901–529000 

|-bgcolor=#fefefe
| 528901 ||  || — || February 14, 2009 || Kitt Peak || Spacewatch ||  || align=right data-sort-value="0.48" | 480 m || 
|-id=902 bgcolor=#d6d6d6
| 528902 ||  || — || January 3, 2009 || Mount Lemmon || Mount Lemmon Survey ||  || align=right | 2.1 km || 
|-id=903 bgcolor=#d6d6d6
| 528903 ||  || — || February 22, 2009 || Kitt Peak || Spacewatch ||  || align=right | 2.3 km || 
|-id=904 bgcolor=#fefefe
| 528904 ||  || — || February 3, 2009 || Kitt Peak || Spacewatch ||  || align=right data-sort-value="0.49" | 490 m || 
|-id=905 bgcolor=#d6d6d6
| 528905 ||  || — || February 3, 2009 || Mount Lemmon || Mount Lemmon Survey ||  || align=right | 1.9 km || 
|-id=906 bgcolor=#fefefe
| 528906 ||  || — || February 19, 2009 || La Sagra || OAM Obs. ||  || align=right data-sort-value="0.75" | 750 m || 
|-id=907 bgcolor=#fefefe
| 528907 ||  || — || February 24, 2009 || Kitt Peak || Spacewatch ||  || align=right data-sort-value="0.73" | 730 m || 
|-id=908 bgcolor=#d6d6d6
| 528908 ||  || — || February 22, 2009 || Kitt Peak || Spacewatch ||  || align=right | 2.5 km || 
|-id=909 bgcolor=#d6d6d6
| 528909 ||  || — || February 28, 2009 || Mount Lemmon || Mount Lemmon Survey ||  || align=right | 2.2 km || 
|-id=910 bgcolor=#E9E9E9
| 528910 ||  || — || February 5, 2009 || Kitt Peak || Spacewatch ||  || align=right | 1.7 km || 
|-id=911 bgcolor=#fefefe
| 528911 ||  || — || February 26, 2009 || Kitt Peak || Spacewatch || PHO || align=right | 1.1 km || 
|-id=912 bgcolor=#fefefe
| 528912 ||  || — || September 10, 2007 || Mount Lemmon || Mount Lemmon Survey ||  || align=right data-sort-value="0.84" | 840 m || 
|-id=913 bgcolor=#fefefe
| 528913 ||  || — || February 19, 2009 || Mount Lemmon || Mount Lemmon Survey || V || align=right data-sort-value="0.51" | 510 m || 
|-id=914 bgcolor=#fefefe
| 528914 ||  || — || February 26, 2009 || Kitt Peak || Spacewatch || H || align=right data-sort-value="0.52" | 520 m || 
|-id=915 bgcolor=#fefefe
| 528915 ||  || — || February 27, 2009 || Kitt Peak || Spacewatch ||  || align=right data-sort-value="0.53" | 530 m || 
|-id=916 bgcolor=#d6d6d6
| 528916 ||  || — || February 27, 2009 || Kitt Peak || Spacewatch ||  || align=right | 2.3 km || 
|-id=917 bgcolor=#d6d6d6
| 528917 ||  || — || February 19, 2009 || Kitt Peak || Spacewatch ||  || align=right | 2.0 km || 
|-id=918 bgcolor=#d6d6d6
| 528918 ||  || — || February 19, 2009 || Kitt Peak || Spacewatch || KOR || align=right | 1.1 km || 
|-id=919 bgcolor=#d6d6d6
| 528919 ||  || — || February 19, 2009 || Kitt Peak || Spacewatch ||  || align=right | 2.5 km || 
|-id=920 bgcolor=#d6d6d6
| 528920 ||  || — || February 22, 2009 || Mount Lemmon || Mount Lemmon Survey ||  || align=right | 2.1 km || 
|-id=921 bgcolor=#d6d6d6
| 528921 ||  || — || August 29, 2006 || Kitt Peak || Spacewatch ||  || align=right | 2.1 km || 
|-id=922 bgcolor=#fefefe
| 528922 ||  || — || September 13, 2007 || Mount Lemmon || Mount Lemmon Survey ||  || align=right data-sort-value="0.59" | 590 m || 
|-id=923 bgcolor=#fefefe
| 528923 ||  || — || September 6, 1997 || Caussols || ODAS ||  || align=right data-sort-value="0.66" | 660 m || 
|-id=924 bgcolor=#d6d6d6
| 528924 ||  || — || February 19, 2009 || Kitt Peak || Spacewatch ||  || align=right | 2.4 km || 
|-id=925 bgcolor=#fefefe
| 528925 ||  || — || February 19, 2009 || Mount Lemmon || Mount Lemmon Survey ||  || align=right data-sort-value="0.81" | 810 m || 
|-id=926 bgcolor=#fefefe
| 528926 ||  || — || February 20, 2009 || Kitt Peak || Spacewatch ||  || align=right data-sort-value="0.66" | 660 m || 
|-id=927 bgcolor=#fefefe
| 528927 ||  || — || February 21, 2009 || Mount Lemmon || Mount Lemmon Survey ||  || align=right data-sort-value="0.53" | 530 m || 
|-id=928 bgcolor=#fefefe
| 528928 ||  || — || February 27, 2009 || Kitt Peak || Spacewatch ||  || align=right data-sort-value="0.57" | 570 m || 
|-id=929 bgcolor=#fefefe
| 528929 ||  || — || February 22, 2009 || Kitt Peak || Spacewatch ||  || align=right data-sort-value="0.68" | 680 m || 
|-id=930 bgcolor=#E9E9E9
| 528930 ||  || — || March 2, 2009 || Mount Lemmon || Mount Lemmon Survey ||  || align=right | 2.3 km || 
|-id=931 bgcolor=#fefefe
| 528931 ||  || — || February 20, 2009 || Kitt Peak || Spacewatch ||  || align=right data-sort-value="0.69" | 690 m || 
|-id=932 bgcolor=#fefefe
| 528932 ||  || — || March 2, 2009 || Kitt Peak || Spacewatch || H || align=right data-sort-value="0.54" | 540 m || 
|-id=933 bgcolor=#d6d6d6
| 528933 ||  || — || February 4, 2009 || Mount Lemmon || Mount Lemmon Survey ||  || align=right | 2.0 km || 
|-id=934 bgcolor=#d6d6d6
| 528934 ||  || — || March 2, 2009 || Mount Lemmon || Mount Lemmon Survey ||  || align=right | 2.1 km || 
|-id=935 bgcolor=#fefefe
| 528935 ||  || — || March 3, 2009 || Kitt Peak || Spacewatch ||  || align=right data-sort-value="0.88" | 880 m || 
|-id=936 bgcolor=#d6d6d6
| 528936 ||  || — || March 2, 2009 || Kitt Peak || Spacewatch ||  || align=right | 2.1 km || 
|-id=937 bgcolor=#d6d6d6
| 528937 ||  || — || March 2, 2009 || Kitt Peak || Spacewatch ||  || align=right | 2.8 km || 
|-id=938 bgcolor=#d6d6d6
| 528938 ||  || — || March 3, 2009 || Kitt Peak || Spacewatch ||  || align=right | 2.8 km || 
|-id=939 bgcolor=#d6d6d6
| 528939 ||  || — || February 3, 2009 || Kitt Peak || Spacewatch ||  || align=right | 2.7 km || 
|-id=940 bgcolor=#fefefe
| 528940 ||  || — || March 16, 2009 || Mount Lemmon || Mount Lemmon Survey ||  || align=right data-sort-value="0.82" | 820 m || 
|-id=941 bgcolor=#d6d6d6
| 528941 ||  || — || September 16, 2006 || Kitt Peak || Spacewatch ||  || align=right | 2.6 km || 
|-id=942 bgcolor=#d6d6d6
| 528942 ||  || — || March 20, 2009 || La Sagra || OAM Obs. || EUP || align=right | 3.3 km || 
|-id=943 bgcolor=#fefefe
| 528943 ||  || — || March 3, 2009 || Catalina || CSS || H || align=right | 1.1 km || 
|-id=944 bgcolor=#d6d6d6
| 528944 ||  || — || March 25, 2009 || Mount Lemmon || Mount Lemmon Survey || TRE || align=right | 2.1 km || 
|-id=945 bgcolor=#d6d6d6
| 528945 ||  || — || March 28, 2009 || Kitt Peak || Spacewatch ||  || align=right | 2.2 km || 
|-id=946 bgcolor=#d6d6d6
| 528946 ||  || — || November 17, 2007 || Kitt Peak || Spacewatch ||  || align=right | 2.7 km || 
|-id=947 bgcolor=#fefefe
| 528947 ||  || — || March 28, 2009 || Mount Lemmon || Mount Lemmon Survey ||  || align=right data-sort-value="0.67" | 670 m || 
|-id=948 bgcolor=#FA8072
| 528948 ||  || — || March 29, 2009 || Mount Lemmon || Mount Lemmon Survey || H || align=right data-sort-value="0.55" | 550 m || 
|-id=949 bgcolor=#fefefe
| 528949 ||  || — || March 24, 2009 || Mount Lemmon || Mount Lemmon Survey ||  || align=right | 1.0 km || 
|-id=950 bgcolor=#d6d6d6
| 528950 ||  || — || March 24, 2009 || Mount Lemmon || Mount Lemmon Survey ||  || align=right | 2.1 km || 
|-id=951 bgcolor=#d6d6d6
| 528951 ||  || — || September 28, 2006 || Kitt Peak || Spacewatch ||  || align=right | 2.4 km || 
|-id=952 bgcolor=#d6d6d6
| 528952 ||  || — || March 31, 2009 || Kitt Peak || Spacewatch ||  || align=right | 2.2 km || 
|-id=953 bgcolor=#fefefe
| 528953 ||  || — || March 16, 2009 || Kitt Peak || Spacewatch ||  || align=right data-sort-value="0.53" | 530 m || 
|-id=954 bgcolor=#d6d6d6
| 528954 ||  || — || February 19, 2009 || Kitt Peak || Spacewatch ||  || align=right | 1.6 km || 
|-id=955 bgcolor=#d6d6d6
| 528955 ||  || — || March 16, 2009 || Kitt Peak || Spacewatch ||  || align=right | 2.3 km || 
|-id=956 bgcolor=#fefefe
| 528956 ||  || — || March 28, 2009 || Kitt Peak || Spacewatch ||  || align=right data-sort-value="0.56" | 560 m || 
|-id=957 bgcolor=#fefefe
| 528957 ||  || — || March 19, 2009 || Mount Lemmon || Mount Lemmon Survey ||  || align=right data-sort-value="0.65" | 650 m || 
|-id=958 bgcolor=#fefefe
| 528958 ||  || — || March 29, 2009 || Kitt Peak || Spacewatch ||  || align=right data-sort-value="0.59" | 590 m || 
|-id=959 bgcolor=#d6d6d6
| 528959 ||  || — || March 24, 2009 || Mount Lemmon || Mount Lemmon Survey ||  || align=right | 2.4 km || 
|-id=960 bgcolor=#d6d6d6
| 528960 ||  || — || March 21, 2009 || Mount Lemmon || Mount Lemmon Survey ||  || align=right | 1.9 km || 
|-id=961 bgcolor=#d6d6d6
| 528961 ||  || — || March 31, 2009 || Mount Lemmon || Mount Lemmon Survey ||  || align=right | 2.0 km || 
|-id=962 bgcolor=#fefefe
| 528962 ||  || — || February 22, 2009 || Kitt Peak || Spacewatch ||  || align=right data-sort-value="0.73" | 730 m || 
|-id=963 bgcolor=#fefefe
| 528963 ||  || — || March 19, 2009 || Kitt Peak || Spacewatch || H || align=right data-sort-value="0.57" | 570 m || 
|-id=964 bgcolor=#fefefe
| 528964 ||  || — || March 29, 2009 || Mount Lemmon || Mount Lemmon Survey ||  || align=right data-sort-value="0.65" | 650 m || 
|-id=965 bgcolor=#d6d6d6
| 528965 ||  || — || April 2, 2009 || Kitt Peak || Spacewatch ||  || align=right | 1.7 km || 
|-id=966 bgcolor=#fefefe
| 528966 ||  || — || February 20, 2009 || Mount Lemmon || Mount Lemmon Survey || H || align=right data-sort-value="0.75" | 750 m || 
|-id=967 bgcolor=#fefefe
| 528967 ||  || — || March 21, 2009 || Catalina || CSS ||  || align=right data-sort-value="0.88" | 880 m || 
|-id=968 bgcolor=#fefefe
| 528968 ||  || — || March 28, 2009 || Kitt Peak || Spacewatch || H || align=right data-sort-value="0.62" | 620 m || 
|-id=969 bgcolor=#fefefe
| 528969 ||  || — || April 17, 2009 || Kitt Peak || Spacewatch || H || align=right data-sort-value="0.55" | 550 m || 
|-id=970 bgcolor=#fefefe
| 528970 ||  || — || April 2, 2009 || Kitt Peak || Spacewatch ||  || align=right data-sort-value="0.62" | 620 m || 
|-id=971 bgcolor=#d6d6d6
| 528971 ||  || — || March 16, 2009 || Kitt Peak || Spacewatch ||  || align=right | 2.0 km || 
|-id=972 bgcolor=#C2FFFF
| 528972 ||  || — || March 1, 2009 || Kitt Peak || Spacewatch || n.a. || align=right | 6.1 km || 
|-id=973 bgcolor=#d6d6d6
| 528973 ||  || — || April 17, 2009 || Kitt Peak || Spacewatch ||  || align=right | 2.9 km || 
|-id=974 bgcolor=#d6d6d6
| 528974 ||  || — || March 17, 2009 || Kitt Peak || Spacewatch ||  || align=right | 2.1 km || 
|-id=975 bgcolor=#d6d6d6
| 528975 ||  || — || September 25, 2006 || Kitt Peak || Spacewatch ||  || align=right | 2.3 km || 
|-id=976 bgcolor=#d6d6d6
| 528976 ||  || — || April 18, 2009 || Kitt Peak || Spacewatch ||  || align=right | 1.9 km || 
|-id=977 bgcolor=#fefefe
| 528977 ||  || — || March 16, 2009 || Kitt Peak || Spacewatch ||  || align=right data-sort-value="0.72" | 720 m || 
|-id=978 bgcolor=#d6d6d6
| 528978 ||  || — || October 4, 2006 || Mount Lemmon || Mount Lemmon Survey ||  || align=right | 3.0 km || 
|-id=979 bgcolor=#fefefe
| 528979 ||  || — || April 19, 2009 || Kitt Peak || Spacewatch || V || align=right data-sort-value="0.47" | 470 m || 
|-id=980 bgcolor=#fefefe
| 528980 ||  || — || February 20, 2009 || Mount Lemmon || Mount Lemmon Survey || H || align=right data-sort-value="0.67" | 670 m || 
|-id=981 bgcolor=#fefefe
| 528981 ||  || — || April 2, 2009 || Mount Lemmon || Mount Lemmon Survey ||  || align=right data-sort-value="0.64" | 640 m || 
|-id=982 bgcolor=#d6d6d6
| 528982 ||  || — || April 20, 2009 || Kitt Peak || Spacewatch ||  || align=right | 3.3 km || 
|-id=983 bgcolor=#E9E9E9
| 528983 ||  || — || April 20, 2009 || Mount Lemmon || Mount Lemmon Survey ||  || align=right | 1.8 km || 
|-id=984 bgcolor=#fefefe
| 528984 ||  || — || April 23, 2009 || Kitt Peak || Spacewatch ||  || align=right data-sort-value="0.65" | 650 m || 
|-id=985 bgcolor=#d6d6d6
| 528985 ||  || — || April 26, 2009 || Kitt Peak || Spacewatch ||  || align=right | 2.4 km || 
|-id=986 bgcolor=#d6d6d6
| 528986 ||  || — || January 30, 2008 || Mount Lemmon || Mount Lemmon Survey ||  || align=right | 2.3 km || 
|-id=987 bgcolor=#fefefe
| 528987 ||  || — || April 22, 2009 || Mount Lemmon || Mount Lemmon Survey ||  || align=right data-sort-value="0.68" | 680 m || 
|-id=988 bgcolor=#d6d6d6
| 528988 ||  || — || April 2, 2009 || Kitt Peak || Spacewatch ||  || align=right | 2.0 km || 
|-id=989 bgcolor=#fefefe
| 528989 ||  || — || February 4, 2005 || Kitt Peak || Spacewatch ||  || align=right data-sort-value="0.61" | 610 m || 
|-id=990 bgcolor=#fefefe
| 528990 ||  || — || April 26, 2009 || Kitt Peak || Spacewatch ||  || align=right data-sort-value="0.55" | 550 m || 
|-id=991 bgcolor=#FA8072
| 528991 ||  || — || April 29, 2009 || Mount Lemmon || Mount Lemmon Survey ||  || align=right data-sort-value="0.54" | 540 m || 
|-id=992 bgcolor=#fefefe
| 528992 ||  || — || April 22, 2009 || Mount Lemmon || Mount Lemmon Survey ||  || align=right data-sort-value="0.65" | 650 m || 
|-id=993 bgcolor=#d6d6d6
| 528993 ||  || — || March 31, 2009 || Mount Lemmon || Mount Lemmon Survey ||  || align=right | 2.2 km || 
|-id=994 bgcolor=#d6d6d6
| 528994 ||  || — || April 30, 2009 || Kitt Peak || Spacewatch ||  || align=right | 3.0 km || 
|-id=995 bgcolor=#fefefe
| 528995 ||  || — || April 22, 2009 || Mount Lemmon || Mount Lemmon Survey ||  || align=right data-sort-value="0.64" | 640 m || 
|-id=996 bgcolor=#E9E9E9
| 528996 ||  || — || April 17, 2009 || Kitt Peak || Spacewatch ||  || align=right | 1.4 km || 
|-id=997 bgcolor=#d6d6d6
| 528997 Tanakatakenori ||  ||  || April 20, 2009 || Zelenchukskaya Stn || T. V. Kryachko ||  || align=right | 2.2 km || 
|-id=998 bgcolor=#d6d6d6
| 528998 ||  || — || October 4, 2006 || Mount Lemmon || Mount Lemmon Survey ||  || align=right | 2.6 km || 
|-id=999 bgcolor=#fefefe
| 528999 ||  || — || April 27, 2009 || Mount Lemmon || Mount Lemmon Survey || H || align=right data-sort-value="0.58" | 580 m || 
|-id=000 bgcolor=#d6d6d6
| 529000 ||  || — || April 22, 2009 || Mount Lemmon || Mount Lemmon Survey ||  || align=right | 2.5 km || 
|}

References

External links 
 Discovery Circumstances: Numbered Minor Planets (525001)–(530000) (IAU Minor Planet Center)

0528